= Great American Interchange =

Paleozoographic event resulting from the formation of the Isthmus of Panama

Examples of migrant species in both Americas. Olive green silhouettes denote North American species with South American ancestors; blue silhouettes denote South American species with North American ancestors.

The Great American Biotic Interchange (GABI), also known as the Great American Interchange and the Great American Faunal Interchange, was an important late Cenozoic paleozoogeographic biotic interchange event in which land and freshwater fauna migrated from North America to South America via Central America and vice versa, as the volcanic Isthmus of Panama rose up from the sea floor, forming a land bridge between the previously separated continents. Although earlier dispersals had occurred, probably over water, the migration accelerated dramatically about 2.7 million years (Ma) ago during the Piacenzian age. It resulted from the joining of the Neotropic (roughly South American) and Nearctic (roughly North American) biogeographic realms definitively to form the Americas. The interchange is visible from observation of both biostratigraphy and nature (neontology). Its most dramatic effect is on the zoogeography of mammals, but it also gave an opportunity for reptiles, amphibians, arthropods, weak-flying or flightless birds, and even freshwater fish to migrate. Coastal and marine biota were affected in the opposite manner; the formation of the Central American Isthmus caused what has been termed the Great American Schism, with significant diversification and extinction occurring as a result of the isolation of the Caribbean from the Pacific.

The occurrence of the interchange was first discussed in 1876 by the "father of biogeography", Alfred Russel Wallace. Wallace had spent five years exploring and collecting specimens in the Amazon basin. Others who made significant contributions to understanding the event in the century that followed include Florentino Ameghino, W. D. Matthew, W. B. Scott, Bryan Patterson, George Gaylord Simpson and S. David Webb. The Pliocene timing of the formation of the connection between North and South America was discussed in 1910 by Henry Fairfield Osborn.

Analogous interchanges occurred earlier in the Cenozoic, when the formerly isolated land masses of India and Africa made contact with Eurasia about 56 and 30 Ma ago, respectively.

== Before the interchange ==
=== Isolation of South America ===
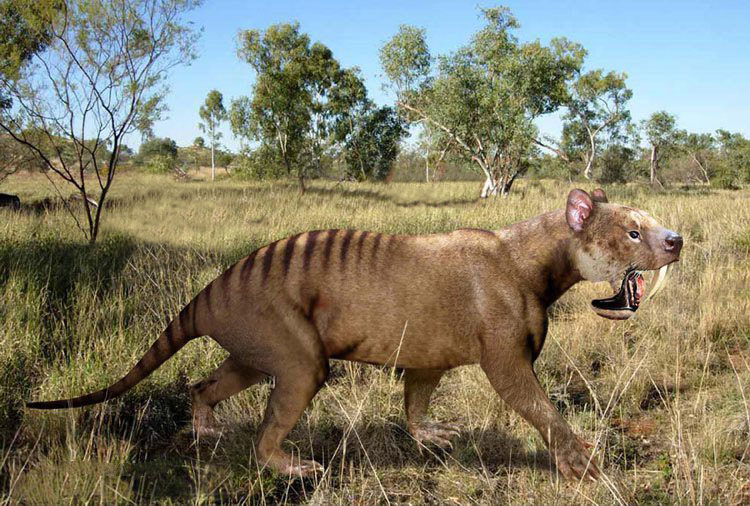
†Thylacosmilus, a sparassodont

After the late Mesozoic breakup of Gondwana, South America spent most of the Cenozoic era as an island continent whose "splendid isolation" allowed its fauna to evolve into many forms found nowhere else on Earth, most of which are now extinct. Its endemic mammals initially consisted primarily of metatherians (marsupials and sparassodonts), xenarthrans, and a diverse group of native ungulates known as the Meridiungulata: notoungulates (the "southern ungulates"), litopterns, astrapotheres, pyrotheres and xenungulates. (Note: During the Eocene, astrapotheres and litopterns were also present in Antarctica.) (Note: Sequencing of collagen from fossils of one recently extinct species each of notoungulates and litopterns has indicated that these orders comprise a sister group to the perissodactyls. Mitochondrial DNA obtained from Macrauchenia corroborates this and gives an estimated divergence date of 66 Ma ago.) A few non-therian mammals – monotremes, gondwanatheres, meridiolestidans and possibly cimolodont multituberculates – were also present in the Paleocene; while none of these diversified significantly and most lineages did not survive long, forms like Necrolestes and Patagonia remained as recently as the Miocene.

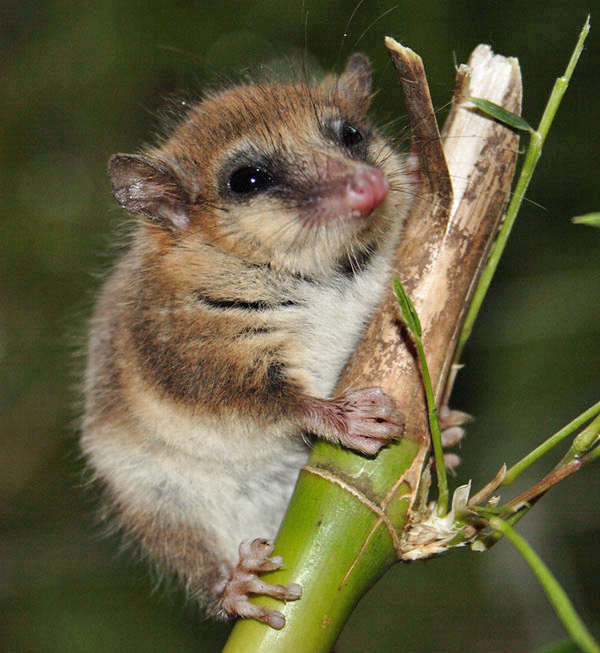
The monito del monte, Dromiciops gliroides, South America's only australidelphian marsupial

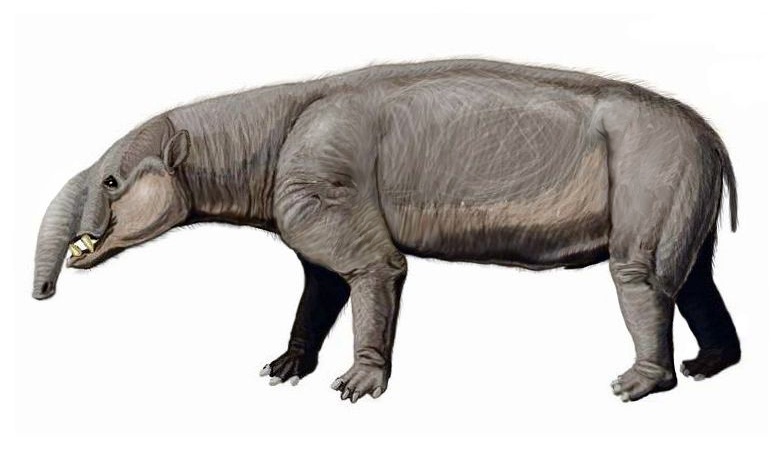
†Astrapotherium magnum

Marsupials appear to have traveled via Gondwanan land connections from South America through Antarctica to Australia in the late Cretaceous or early Tertiary. (Note: Once in Australia, facing less competition, marsupials diversified to fill a much larger array of niches than in South America, where they were largely carnivorous.) One living South American marsupial, the monito del monte, has been shown to be more closely related to Australian marsupials than to other South American marsupials (Ameridelphia); however, it is the most basal australidelphian, (Note: It is the sister group to a clade containing all other extant australidelphians (roughly 238 species).) meaning that this superorder arose in South America and then dispersed to Australia after the monito del monte split off. Monotrematum, a 61-Ma-old platypus-like monotreme fossil from Patagonia, may represent an Australian immigrant. Paleognath birds (ratites and South American tinamous) may have made a similar migration around the same time to Australia and New Zealand. Other taxa that may have dispersed by the same route (if not by flying or oceanic dispersal) are parrots, chelid turtles, and the extinct meiolaniid turtles.

Marsupials remaining in South America included didelphimorphs (opossums), paucituberculatans (shrew opossums) and microbiotheres (monitos del monte). Larger predatory relatives of these also existed, such as the borhyaenids and the saber-toothed Thylacosmilus; these were sparassodont metatherians, which are no longer considered to be true marsupials. As the large carnivorous metatherians declined, and before the arrival of most types of carnivorans, predatory opossums such as Thylophorops temporarily attained larger size (about 7 kg).

Metatherians and a few xenarthran armadillos, such as Macroeuphractus, were the only South American mammals to specialize as carnivores; their relative inefficiency created openings for nonmammalian predators to play more prominent roles than usual (similar to the situation in Australia). Sparassodonts and giant opossums shared the ecological niches for large predators with fearsome flightless "terror birds" (phorusrhacids), whose closest living relatives are the seriemas. North America also had large terrestrial predatory birds during the early Cenozoic (the related bathornithids), but they died out before the GABI in the Early Miocene, about 20 million years ago. Through the skies over late Miocene South America (6 Ma ago) soared one of the largest flying birds known, Argentavis, a teratorn that had a wing span of 6 m or more, and which may have subsisted in part on the leftovers of Thylacosmilus kills. Terrestrial sebecid (metasuchian) crocodyliforms with ziphodont teeth (Note: Ziphodont (lateromedially compressed, recurved and serrated) teeth tend to arise in terrestrial crocodilians because, unlike their aquatic cousins, they are unable to dispatch their prey by simply holding them underwater and drowning them; they thus need cutting teeth with which to slice open their victims.) were also present at least through the middle Miocene and maybe to the Miocene-Pliocene boundary. Some of South America's aquatic crocodilians, such as Gryposuchus, Mourasuchus and Purussaurus, reached monstrous sizes, with lengths up to 12 m (comparable to the largest Mesozoic crocodyliforms). They shared their habitat with one of the largest turtles of all time, the 3.3 m (11 ft) Stupendemys.

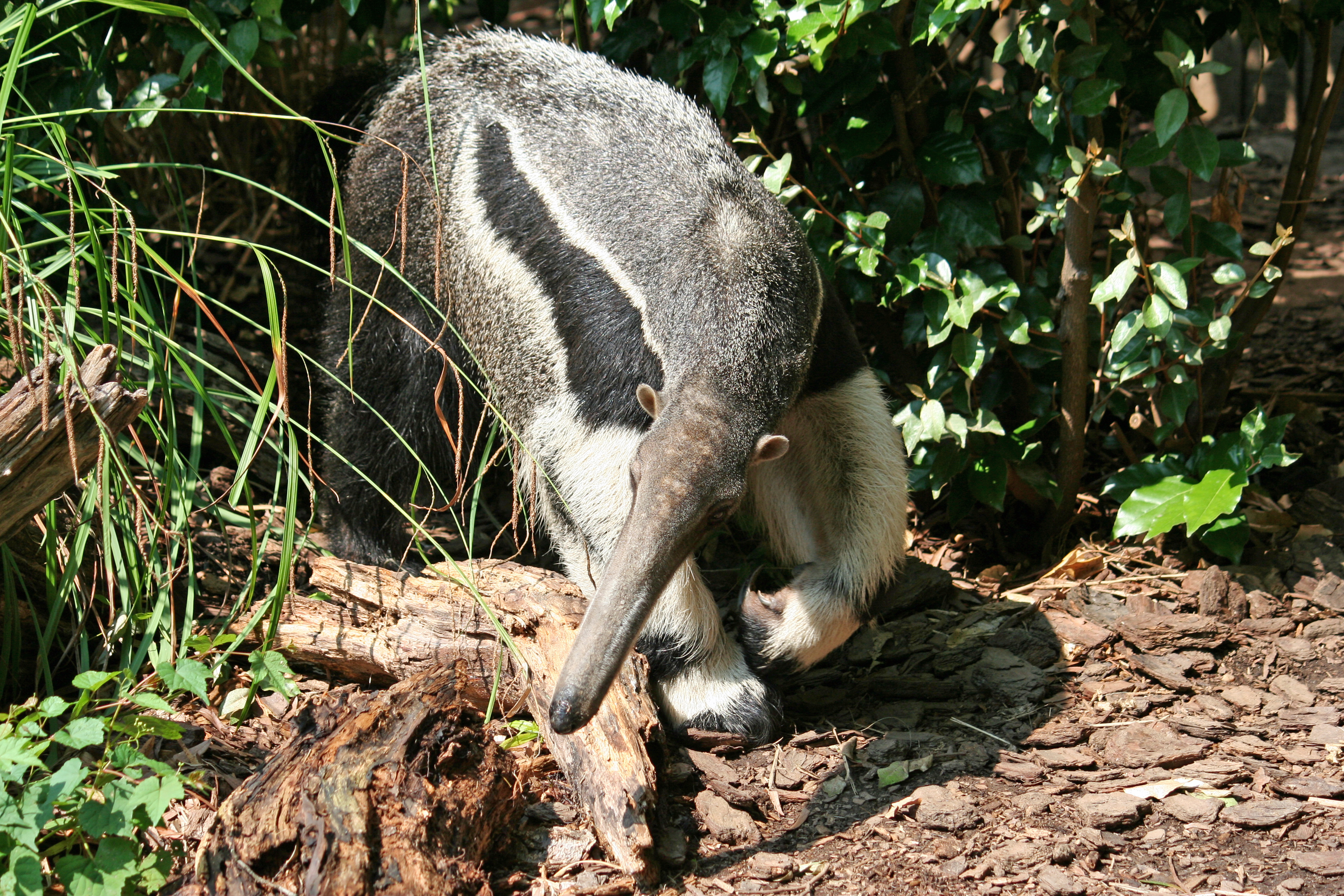
The giant anteater, Myrmecophaga tridactyla, the largest living descendant of South America's early Cenozoic mammalian fauna

Xenarthrans are a curious group of mammals that developed morphological adaptations for specialized diets very early in their history. In addition to those extant today (armadillos, anteaters, and tree sloths), a great diversity of larger types was present, including pampatheres, the ankylosaur-like glyptodonts, predatory euphractines, various ground sloths, some of which reached the size of elephants (e.g. Megatherium), and even semiaquatic to aquatic marine sloths.

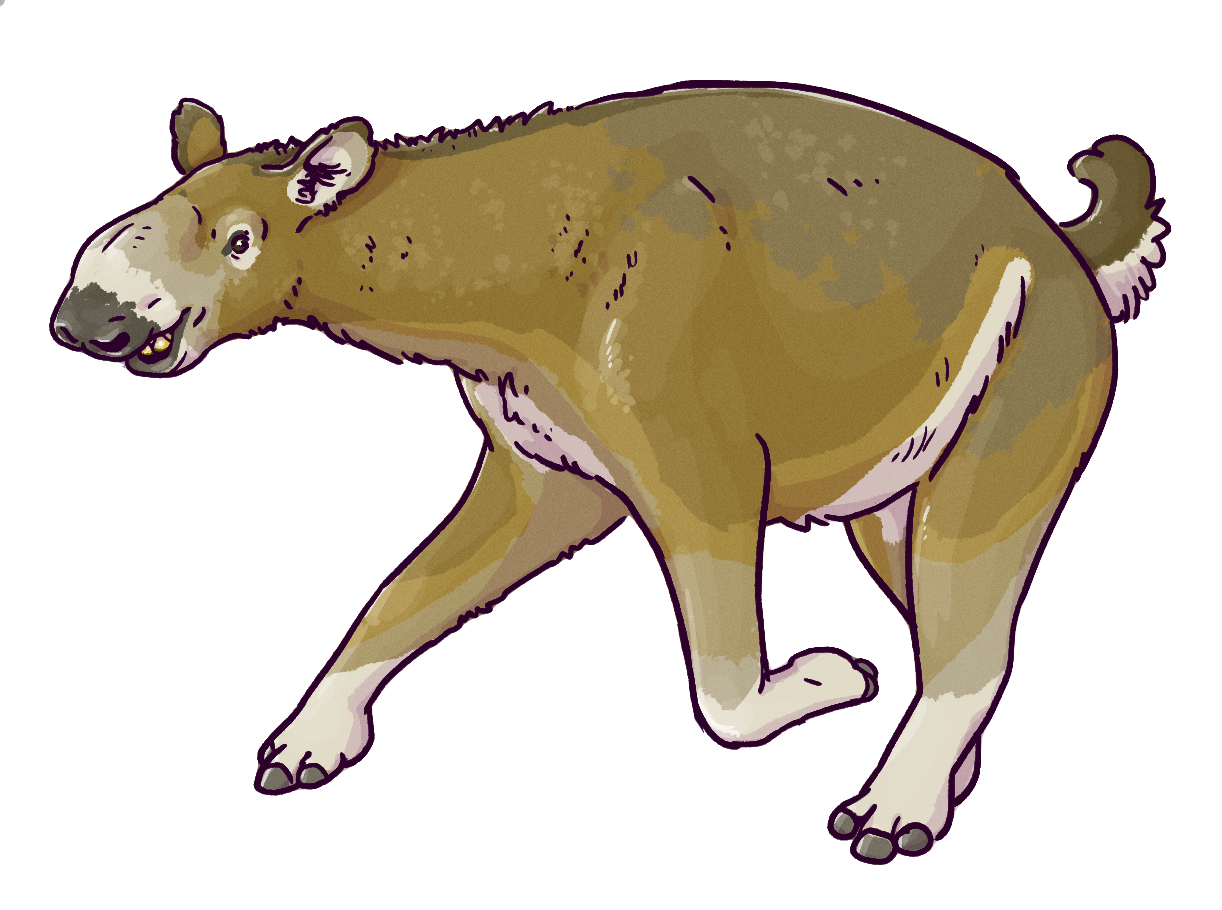
Life restoration of †Macrauchenia, an ungulate belonging to the extinct South American native ungulate order Litopterna

The notoungulates and litopterns had many strange forms, such as Macrauchenia, a camel-like litoptern with a small proboscis. They also produced a number of familiar-looking body types that represent examples of parallel or convergent evolution: one-toed Thoatherium had legs like those of a horse, Pachyrukhos resembled a rabbit, Homalodotherium was a semibipedal, clawed browser like a chalicothere, and horned Trigodon looked like a rhinoceros. Both groups started evolving in the Lower Paleocene, possibly from condylarth stock, diversified, dwindled before the great interchange, and went extinct at the end of the Pleistocene. The pyrotheres and astrapotheres were also strange, but were less diverse and disappeared earlier, well before the interchange.

The North American fauna was a typical boreoeutherian one, supplemented with Afrotherian proboscids.

=== Pre-interchange oceanic dispersals ===
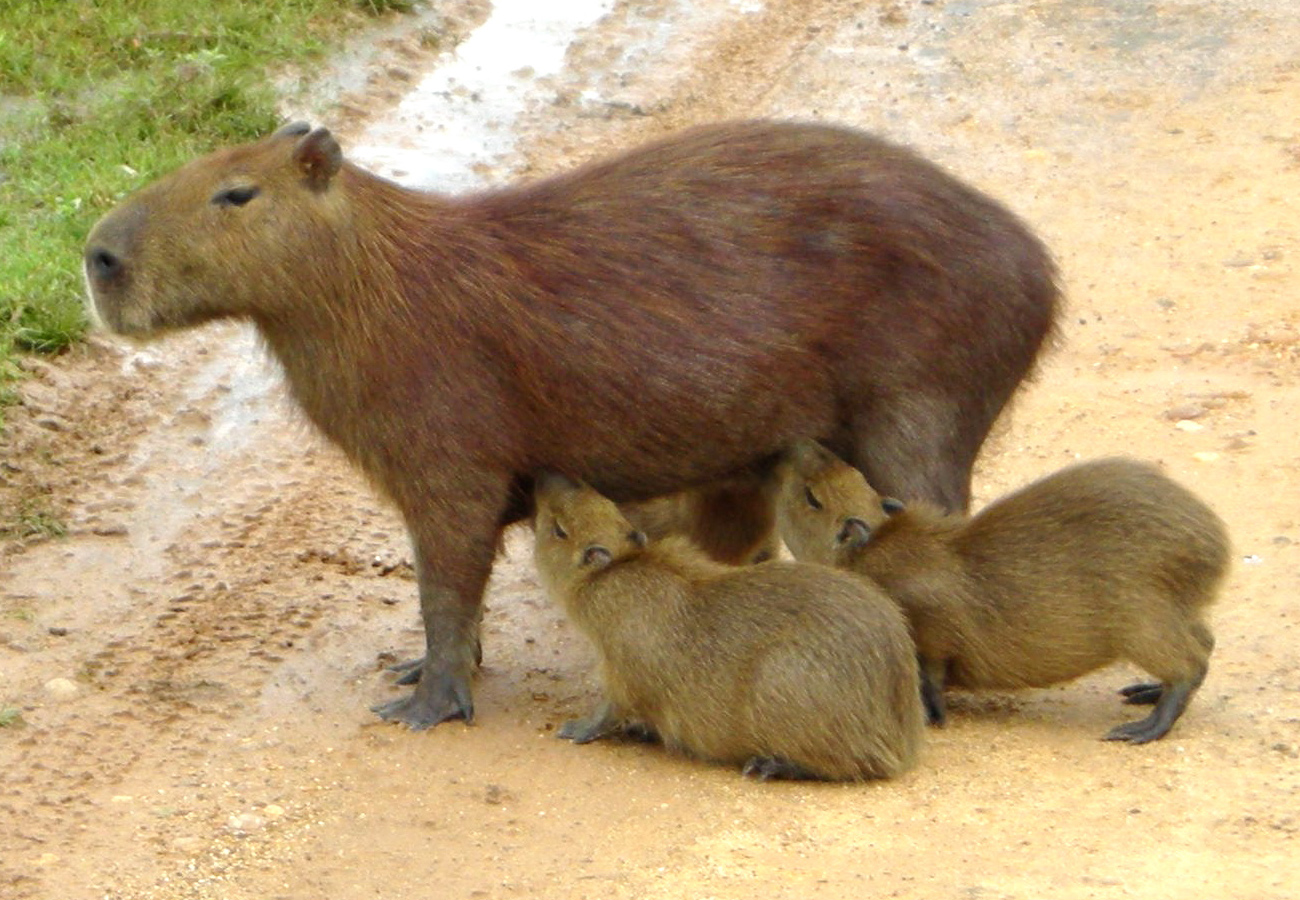
Capybara, Hydrochoerus hydrochaeris

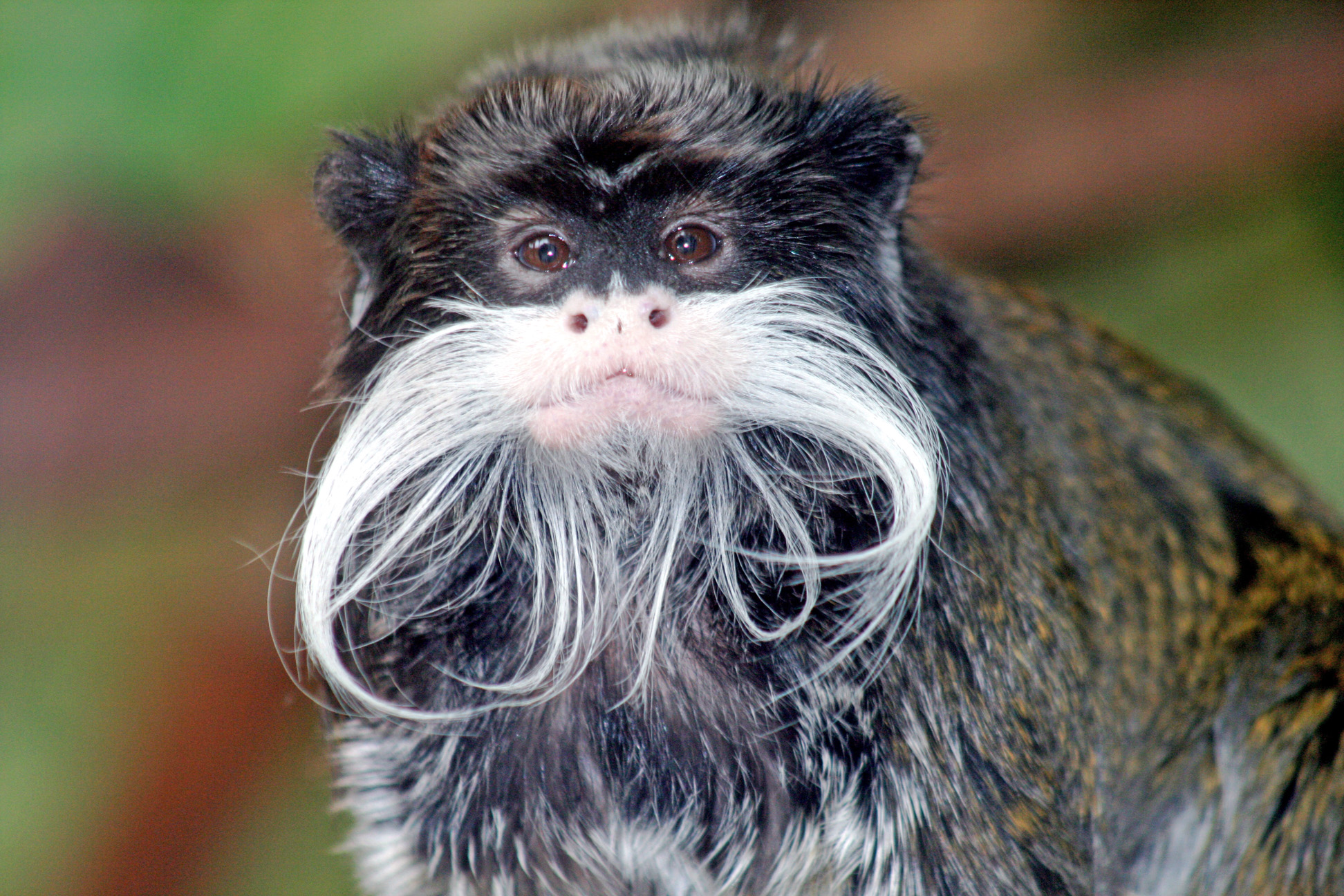
Emperor tamarin, Saguinus imperator

==== African origin ====
The invasions of South America started about 40 Ma ago (middle Eocene), when caviomorph rodents arrived in South America. Their subsequent vigorous diversification displaced some of South America's small marsupials and gave rise to – among others – capybaras, chinchillas, viscachas, and New World porcupines. The independent development of spines by New and Old World porcupines is another example of parallel evolution. This invasion most likely came from Africa. The crossing from West Africa to the northeast corner of Brazil was much shorter then, due to continental drift, and may have been aided by island hopping (e.g. via St. Paul's Rocks, if they were an inhabitable island at the time) and westward oceanic currents. Crossings of the ocean were accomplished when at least one fertilised female (more commonly a group of animals) accidentally floated over on driftwood or mangrove rafts. Hutias (Capromyidae) would subsequently colonize the West Indies as far as the Bahamas, reaching the Greater Antilles by the early Oligocene. Over time, some caviomorph rodents evolved into larger forms that competed with some of the native South American ungulates, which may have contributed to the gradual loss of diversity suffered by the latter after the early Oligocene. By the Pliocene, some caviomorphs (e.g., Josephoartigasia monesi) attained sizes on the order of 500 kg (1,100 lb) or larger.

Later (by 36 Ma ago), primates followed, again from Africa in a fashion similar to that of the rodents. Primates capable of migrating had to be small. Like caviomorph rodents, South American monkeys are believed to be a clade (i.e., monophyletic). However, although they would have had little effective competition, all extant New World monkeys appear to derive from a radiation that occurred long afterwards, in the Early Miocene about 18 Ma ago. Subsequent to this, monkeys apparently most closely related to titis island-hopped to Cuba, Hispaniola, and Jamaica. Additionally, a find of seven 21-Ma-old apparent cebid teeth in Panama suggests that South American monkeys had dispersed across the seaway separating Central and South America by that early date. However, all extant Central American monkeys are believed to be descended from much later migrants, and there is as yet no evidence that these early Central American cebids established an extensive or long-lasting population, perhaps due to a shortage of suitable rainforest habitat at the time.

Fossil evidence presented in 2020 indicates a second lineage of African monkeys also rafted to and at least briefly colonized South America. Ucayalipithecus remains dating from the Early Oligocene of Amazonian Peru are, by morphological analysis, deeply nested within the family Parapithecidae of the Afro-Arabian radiation of parapithecoid simians, with dental features markedly different from those of platyrrhines. The Old World members of this group are thought to have become extinct by the Late Oligocene. Qatrania wingi of lower Oligocene Fayum deposits is considered the closest known relative of Ucayalipithecus.

Remarkably, the descendants of those few bedraggled "waifs" that crawled ashore from their rafts of African flotsam in the Eocene now constitute more than twice as many of South America's species as the descendants of all the mammals previously resident on the continent (372 caviomorph and monkey species versus 136 marsupial and xenarthran species). (Note: It is also notable that both simians (ancestral to monkeys) and hystricognath rodents (ancestral to caviomorphs) are believed to have arrived in Africa by rafting from Eurasia about 40 Ma ago.)

Many of South America's bats may have arrived from Africa during roughly the same period, possibly with the aid of intervening islands, although by flying rather than floating. Noctilionoid bats ancestral to those in the neotropical families Furipteridae, Mormoopidae, Noctilionidae, Phyllostomidae, and Thyropteridae are thought to have reached South America from Africa in the Eocene, possibly via Antarctica. Similarly, free-tailed bats (Molossidae) may have reached South America from Africa in as many as five dispersals, starting in the Eocene. Emballonurids may have also reached South America from Africa about 30 Ma ago, based on molecular evidence.

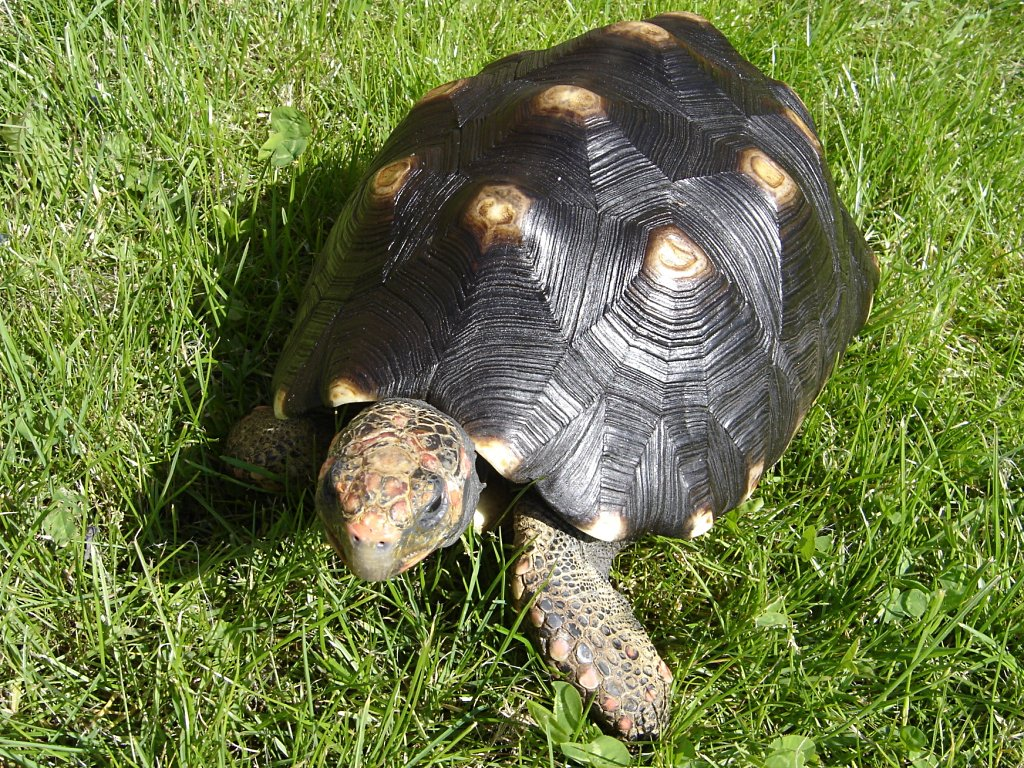
Red-footed tortoise, Chelonoidis carbonaria

Tortoises also arrived in South America in the Oligocene. They were long thought to have come from North America, but a recent comparative genetic analysis concludes that the South American genus Chelonoidis (formerly part of Geochelone) is actually most closely related to African hingeback tortoises. (Note: North American gopher tortoises are most closely related to the Asian genus Manouria.) Tortoises are aided in oceanic dispersal by their ability to float with their heads up, and to survive up to six months without food or water. South American tortoises then went on to colonize the West Indies and Galápagos Islands (the Galápagos tortoise). A number of clades of American geckos seem to have rafted over from Africa during both the Paleogene and Neogene. Skinks of the related genera Mabuya and Trachylepis apparently dispersed across the Atlantic from Africa to South America and Fernando de Noronha, respectively, during the last 9 Ma. Surprisingly, South America's burrowing amphisbaenians and blind snakes also appear to have rafted from Africa, as does the hoatzin, a weak-flying bird of South American rainforests. Gavialids and crocodiles are believed to have radiated across the Americas from Africa via oceanic dispersal, although an Australia/Asian origin has also been considered.

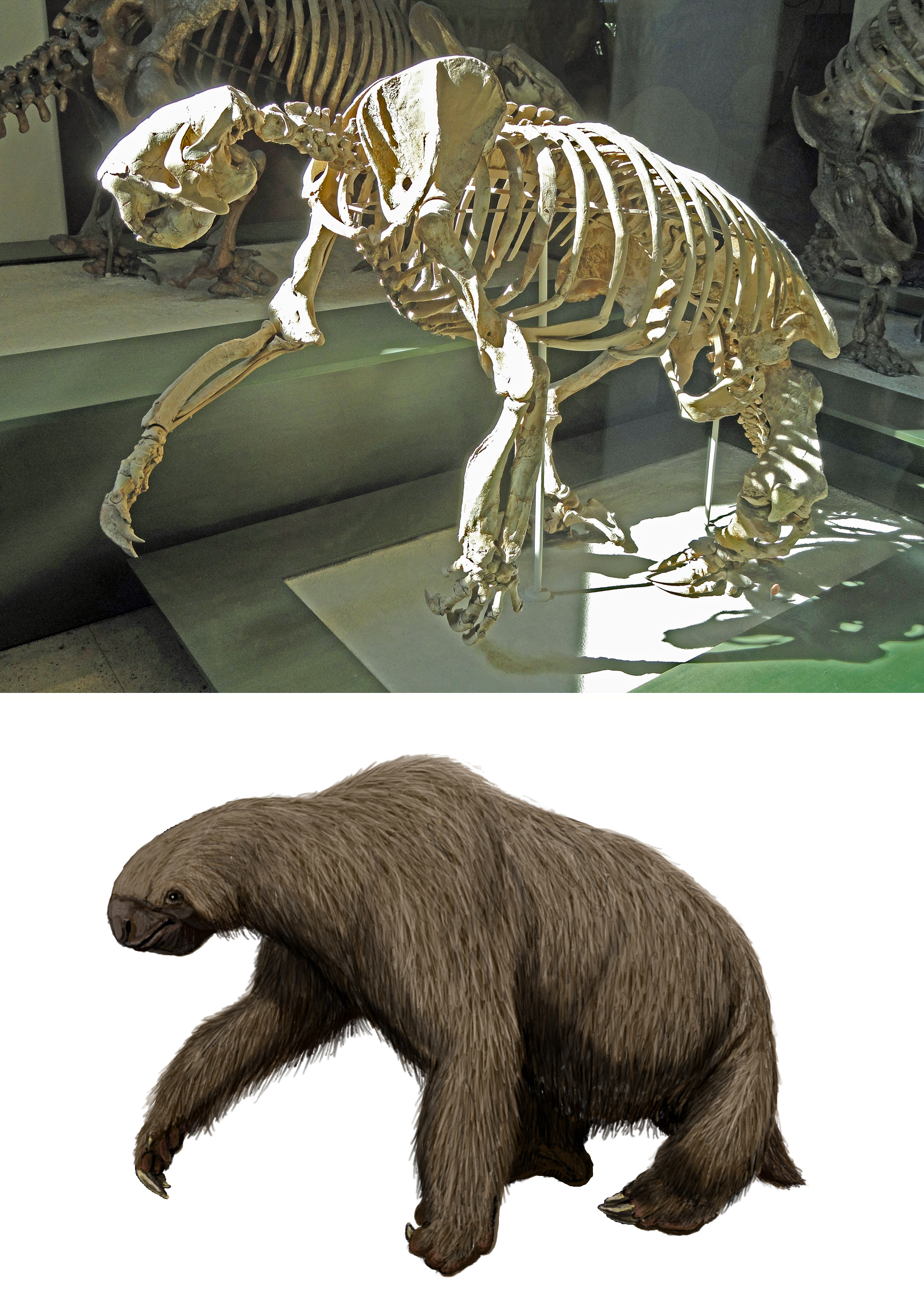
†Megalonyx wheatleyi

==== South American origin ====
Caimans are believed to have repeatedly colonized North America as early as the Eocene, with more derived caimans (such as Centenariosuchus and Purussaurus) and podocnemidid turtles appearing by the early Miocene. Additionally, Gryposuchines such as Aktiogavialis and Dadagavialis may have dispersed from northern South America into North America via the Caribbean Sea. Sebecid crocodylomorphs may have island hopped into the Caribbean during the Eocene-Oligocene, going extinct around 4.5Ma ago.

Megalonychid and mylodontid ground sloths island-hopped to North America by 9 Ma ago. A basal group of sloths had colonized the Antilles previously, by the early Miocene. In contrast, megatheriid and nothrotheriid ground sloths did not migrate north until the formation of the isthmus. Sloths first appear in Florida after a major sea level lowstand at the terminus of the Miocene. Terror birds may have also island-hopped to North America as early as 5 Ma ago.

The Caribbean Islands were populated primarily by species from South America, due to the prevailing direction of oceanic currents, rather than to a competition between North and South American forms. Except in the case of Jamaica, oryzomyine rodents of North American origin were able to enter the region only after invading South America.

==== North American origin ====
The earliest traditionally recognized mammalian arrival from North America was a procyonid that island-hopped from Central America before the Isthmus of Panama land bridge formed, around 7.3 Ma ago. This was South America's first eutherian carnivore. South American procyonids then diversified into forms now extinct (e.g. the "dog-coati" Cyonasua, which evolved into the bear-like Chapalmalania). However, all extant procyonid genera appear to have originated in North America. The first South American procyonids may have contributed to the extinction of sebecid crocodilians by eating their eggs, but this view has not been universally viewed as plausible. (Note: An alternative explanation blames climatic and physiographic changes associated with the uplift of the Andes.) The procyonids were followed to South America by rafting or island-hopping hog-nosed skunks and sigmodontine rodents. The oryzomyine tribe of sigmodontine rodents went on to colonize the Lesser Antilles to Anguilla. Vespertilionid bats may have arrived in five dispersals from North America and one from Africa. Natalids are thought to have arrived during the Pliocene from North America via the Caribbean.

One group has proposed that a number of large Neartic herbivores actually reached South America as early as 9–10 Ma ago, in the late Miocene, via an early incomplete land bridge. These claims, based on fossils recovered from rivers in southwestern Peru, have been viewed with caution by other investigators, due to the lack of corroborating finds from other sites and the fact that almost all of the specimens in question have been collected as float in rivers without little to no stratigraphic control. These taxa are a gomphothere (Amahuacatherium), peccaries (Sylvochoerus and Waldochoerus), tapirs and Surameryx, a palaeomerycid (from a family probably ancestral to cervids). The identification of Amahuacatherium and the dating of its site is controversial; it is regarded by a number of investigators as a misinterpreted fossil of a different gomphothere, Notiomastodon, and biostratigraphy dates the site to the Pleistocene. The early date proposed for Surameryx has also been met with skepticism.

== Effects and aftermath ==
The formation of the Isthmus of Panama led to the last and most conspicuous wave, the Great American Biotic Interchange (GABI), starting around 2.7 Ma ago. This included the immigration into South America of North American ungulates (including camelids, tapirs, deer and horses), proboscids (gomphotheres), carnivorans (including felids such as cougars, jaguars and saber-toothed cats, canids, mustelids, procyonids and bears) and a number of types of rodents. (Note: Of the 6 families of North American rodents that did not originate in South America, only beavers and mountain beavers failed to migrate to South America. (However, human-introduced beavers have become serious pests in Tierra del Fuego.)) The larger members of the reverse migration were ground sloths, terror birds, glyptodonts, pampatheres, capybaras, and the notoungulate Mixotoxodon (the only South American ungulate known to have invaded Central America).

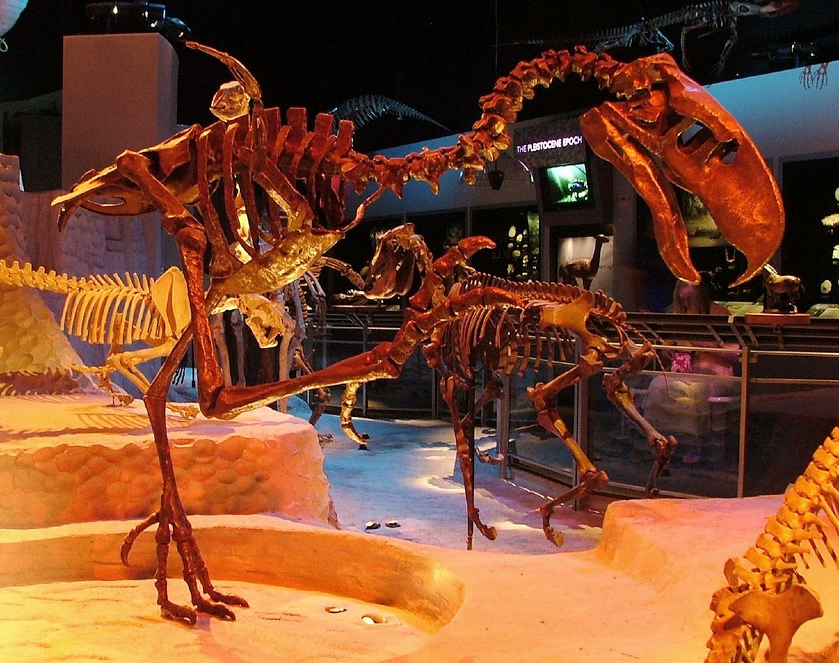
†Titanis walleri, the only known North American terror bird

In general, the initial net migration was symmetrical. Later on, however, the Neotropic species proved far less successful than the Nearctic. This difference in fortunes was manifested in several ways. Northwardly migrating animals often were not able to compete for resources as well as the North American species already occupying the same ecological niches; those that did become established were not able to diversify much, and in some cases did not survive for long. Southwardly migrating Nearctic species established themselves in larger numbers and diversified considerably more, and are thought to have caused the extinction of a large proportion of the South American fauna. (No extinctions in North America are plainly linked to South American immigrants. (Note: In this connection, however, chalicotheres, clawed perissodactyl herbivores ecologically similar to ground sloths, died out in North America in the Miocene about 9 Ma ago, while they survived to the early Pleistocene in Asia and Africa.)) South American native ungulates did poorly, with only a handful of genera withstanding the northern onslaught. (Several of the largest forms, macraucheniids and toxodontids, have long been recognized to have survived to the end of the Pleistocene. Recent fossil finds indicate that one species of the horse-like proterotheriid litopterns did, as well. The notoungulate mesotheriids and hegetotheriids also managed to hold on at least part way through the Pleistocene.)^{[A]} South America's small marsupials, though, survived in large numbers, while the primitive-looking xenarthrans proved to be surprisingly competitive and became the most successful invaders of North America. The African immigrants, the caviomorph rodents and platyrrhine monkeys, were less impacted by the interchange than most of South America's 'old-timers', although the caviomorphs suffered a significant loss of diversity, (Note: Simpson, 1950, p. 382) (Note: Marshall, 1988, p. 386) including the elimination of the largest forms (e.g. the dinomyids). With the exception of the North American porcupine and several extinct porcupines and capybaras, however, they did not migrate past Central America. (Note: Of the 11 extant families of South American caviomorph rodents, five are present in Central America; only two of these, Erethizontidae and Caviidae, ever reached North America. (The nutria/coypu has been introduced to a number of North American locales.))

Due in large part to the continued success of the xenarthrans, one area of South American ecospace the Nearctic invaders were unable to dominate was the niches for megaherbivores. Before 12,000 years ago, South America was home to about 25 species of herbivores weighing more than 1,000 kg (2,200 lb), consisting of Neotropic ground sloths, glyptodonts, and toxodontids, as well as gomphotheres and camelids of Nearctic origin. (Note: P. S. Martin (2005), pp. 30–37, 119. The figure of 25 South American megaherbivore species breaks down as follows: four gomphotheres, two camelids, nine ground sloths, five glyptodonts, and five toxodontids. This can be compared to Africa's present and recent total of six megaherbivores: one giraffe, one hippo, two rhinos, and two elephants (considering the African forest elephant as a separate species).) Native South American forms made up about 75% of these species. However, none of these megaherbivores has survived.

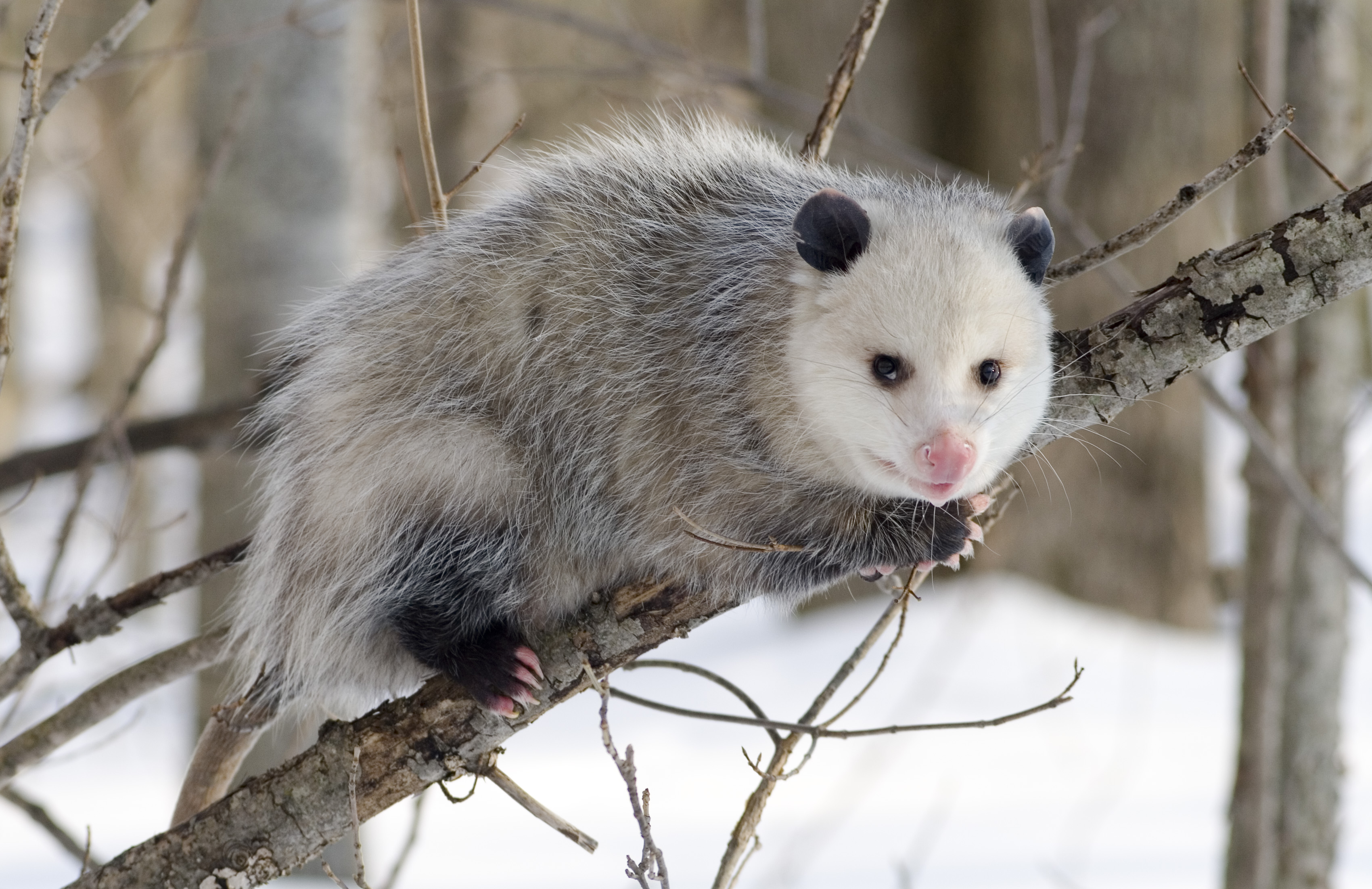
The Virginia opossum, Didelphis virginiana, the only marsupial in temperate North America

Armadillos, opossums and porcupines are present in North America today because of the Great American Interchange. Opossums and porcupines were among the most successful northward migrants, reaching as far as Canada and Alaska, respectively. Most major groups of xenarthrans were present in North America until the end-Pleistocene Quaternary extinction event (as a result of at least eight successful invasions of temperate North America, and at least six more invasions of Central America only). Among the megafauna, ground sloths were notably successful emigrants; four different lineages invaded North America. A megalonychid representative, Megalonyx, spread as far north as the Yukon and Alaska, and might well have invaded Eurasia had a suitable habitat corridor across Beringia been present.

Generally speaking, however, the dispersal and subsequent explosive adaptive radiation of sigmodontine rodents throughout South America (leading to over 80 currently recognized genera) was vastly more successful (both spatially and by number of species) than any northward migration of South American mammals. Other examples of North American mammal groups that diversified conspicuously in South America include canids and cervids, both of which currently have three or four genera in North America, two or three in Central America, and six in South America. (Note: The extant canid and cervid genera by continent are as follows: Canid genera by continent: North America: 3 genera, 9 species – Canis, Urocyon, Vulpes; Central America: 3 genera, 4 species – Canis, Speothos, Urocyon; South America: 6 genera, 11 species – Atelocynus, Cerdocyon, Chrysocyon, Lycalopex, Speothos, Urocyon; Eurasia: 4 genera, 12 species – Canis, Cuon, Nyctereutes, Vulpes; Africa: 4 genera, 12 species – Canis, Lycaon, Otocyon, Vulpes; Cervid genera by continent: North America: 4 genera, 5 species – Alces, Cervus, Odocoileus, Rangifer; Central America: 2 genera, 4 species – Mazama, Odocoileus; South America: 6 genera, 16 species – Blastocerus, Hippocamelus, Mazama, Odocoileus, Ozotoceros, Pudu; Eurasia: 10 genera, 36 species – Alces, Axis, Capreolus, Cervus, Dama, Elaphodus, Elaphurus, Hydropotes, Muntiacus, Rangifer; Africa: 1 genus, 1 species – Cervus) (Note: Including extinct genera, South America has hosted nine genera of cervids, eight genera of mustelids, and 10 genera of canids. However, some of this diversity of South American forms apparently arose in North or Central America prior to the interchange. Significant disagreement exists in the literature concerning how much of the diversification of South America's canids occurred prior to the invasions. A number of studies concur that the grouping of endemic South American canids (excluding Urocyon and Canis, although sometimes transferring C. gezi to the South American group) is a clade. However, different authors conclude that members of this clade reached South America in at least two, three to four, or six invasions from North America.) Although members of Canis (specifically, coyotes) currently range only as far south as Panama, (Note: Canis, e.g. Canis dirus, was present in South America until the end of the Pleistocene.) South America still has more extant genera of canids than any other continent. Colonization of South America via the Isthmus of Panama also triggered an accelerated process of evolutionary radiation and recent speciation in arboreal squirrels (Sciurini) within the Amazon basin and the Andes mountain range.

The effect of formation of the isthmus on the marine biota of the area was the inverse of its effect on terrestrial organisms, a development that has been termed the "Great American Schism". The connection between the east Pacific Ocean and the Caribbean (the Central American Seaway) was severed, setting now-separated populations on divergent evolutionary paths. Caribbean species also had to adapt to an environment of lower productivity after the inflow of nutrient-rich water of deep Pacific origin was blocked. The Pacific coast of South America cooled as the input of warm water from the Caribbean was cut off. This trend is thought to have caused the extinction of the marine sloths of the area.

=== Disappearance of native South American predators ===
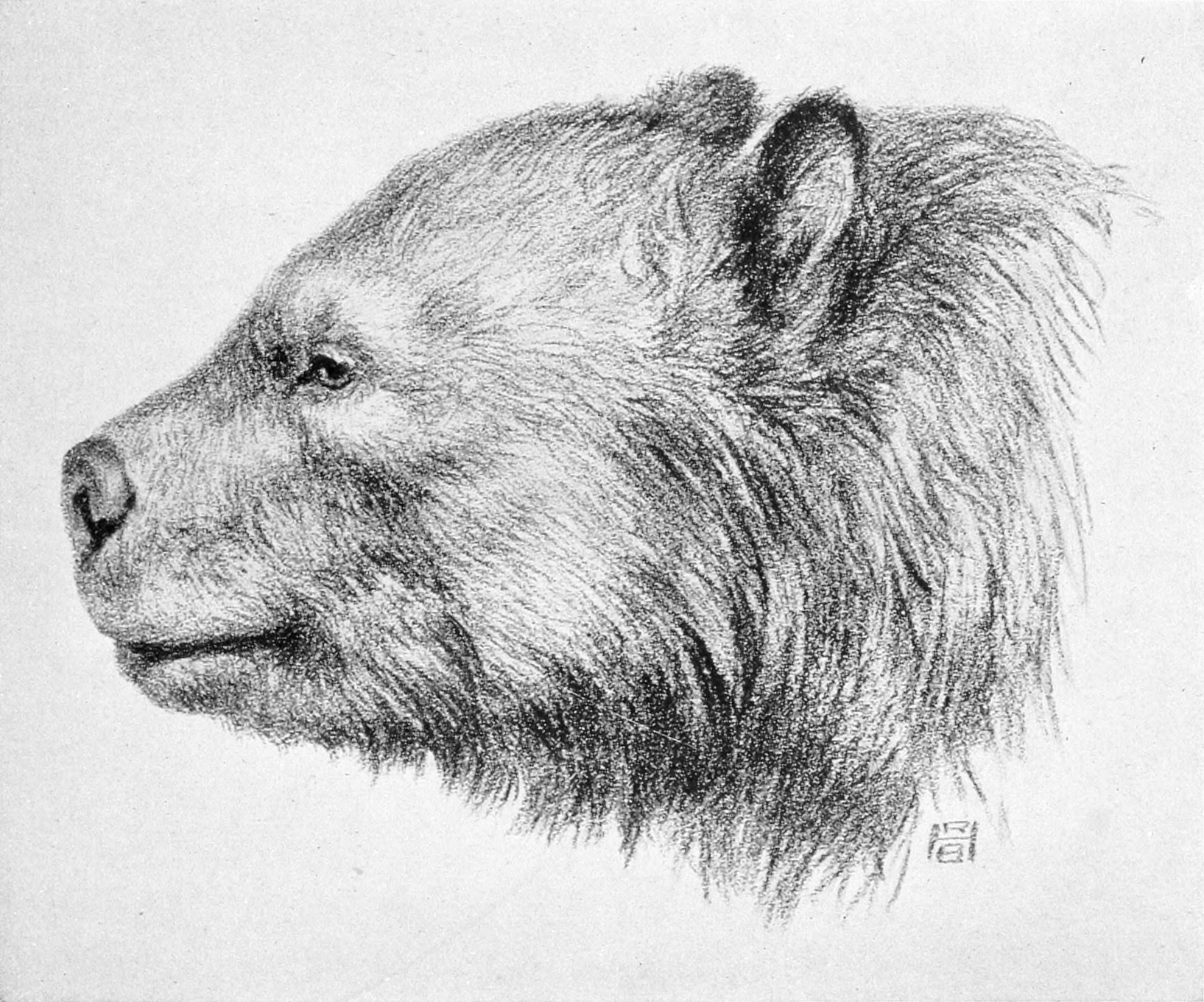
†Arctotherium bonariense, a South American short-faced bear

During the last 7 Ma, South America's terrestrial predator guild has changed from one composed almost entirely of nonplacental mammals (metatherians), birds, and reptiles to one dominated by immigrant placental carnivorans (with a few small marsupial and avian predators like didelphine opossums and seriemas). It was originally thought that the native South American predator guild, including sparassodonts, carnivorous opossums like Thylophorops and Hyperdidelphys, armadillos such as Macroeuphractus, terror birds, and teratorns, as well as early-arriving immigrant Cyonasua-group procyonids, were driven to extinction during the GABI by competitive exclusion from immigrating placental carnivorans, and that this turnover was abrupt. However, the turnover of South America's predator guild was more complex, with competition only playing a limited role.

In the case of sparassodonts and carnivorans, which has been the most heavily studied, little evidence shows that sparassodonts even encountered their hypothesized placental competitors. Many supposed Pliocene records of South American carnivorans have turned out to be misidentified or misdated. Sparassodonts appear to have been declining in diversity since the middle Miocene, with many of the niches once occupied by small sparassodonts being increasingly occupied by carnivorous opossums, which reached sizes of up to roughly 8 kg (~17 lbs). Whether sparassodonts competed with carnivorous opossums or whether opossums began occupying sparassodont niches through passive replacement is still debated. Borhyaenids last occur in the late Miocene, about 4 Ma before the first appearance of canids or felids in South America. Thylacosmilids last occur about 3 Ma ago and appear to be rarer at pre-GABI Pliocene sites than Miocene ones.

In general, sparassodonts appear to have been mostly or entirely extinct by the time most nonprocyonid carnivorans arrived, with little overlap between the groups. Purported ecological counterparts between pairs of analogous groups (thylacosmilids and saber-toothed cats, borhyaenids and felids, hathliacynids and weasels) neither overlap in time nor abruptly replace one another in the fossil record. Procyonids dispersed to South America by at least 7 Ma ago, and had achieved a modest endemic radiation by the time other carnivorans arrived (Cyonasua-group procyonids). However, procyonids do not appear to have competed with sparassodonts, the procyonids being large omnivores and sparassodonts being primarily hypercarnivorous. Other groups of carnivorans did not arrive in South America until much later. Dogs and weasels appear in South America about 2.9 Ma ago, but do not become abundant or diverse until the early Pleistocene. Bears, cats, and skunks do not appear in South America until the early Pleistocene (about 1 Ma ago or slightly earlier). Otters and other groups of procyonids (i.e., coatis, raccoons) have been suggested to have dispersed to South America in the Miocene based on genetic data, but no remains of these animals have been found even at heavily sampled northern South American fossil sites such as La Venta (Colombia), which is only 600 km (370 mi) from the Isthmus of Panama.

Other groups of native South American predators have not been studied in as much depth. Terror birds have often been suggested to have been driven to extinction by placental carnivorans, though this hypothesis has not been investigated in detail. Titanis dispersed from South America to North America against the main wave of carnivoran migrations, being the only large native South American carnivore to accomplish this. However, it only colonized North America for a limited time, failing to diversify and going extinct in the early Pleistocene (1.8 Ma ago); the modest scale of its success has been suggested to be due to competition with placental carnivorans. However, this is questionable as paleohistogical evidence shows that terror birds had uninterrupted growth similar to that of continental birds. This would've made them less vulnerable to competition and predation by North American invaders, suggesting that carnivorans likely didn't play a role in terror birds extinction. Terror birds also decline in diversity after about 3 Ma ago. At least one genus of relatively small terror birds, Psilopterus, appears to have survived to as recently as about 96,000 years ago.

The native carnivore guild appears to have collapsed completely roughly 3 Ma ago (including the extinction of the last sparassodonts), not correlated with the arrival of carnivorans in South America, with terrestrial carnivore diversity being low thereafter. This has been suggested to have opened up ecological niches and allowed carnivorans to establish themselves in South America due to low competition. A meteor impact 3.3 million years ago in southern South America has been suggested as a possible cause of this turnover, but this is still controversial. A similar pattern occurs in the crocodilian fauna, where modern crocodiles (Crocodylus) dispersed to South America during the Pliocene and became the dominant member of crocodilian communities after the late Miocene extinction of the previously dominant large native crocodilians such as the giant caiman Purussaurus and giant gharial Gryposuchus, which is thought to be related to the loss of wetlands habitat across northern South America.

Whether this revised scenario with a reduced role for competitive exclusion applies to other groups of South American mammals such as notoungulates and litopterns is unclear, though some authors have pointed out a protracted decline in South American native ungulate diversity since the middle Miocene. Regardless of how this turnover happened, it is clear that carnivorans benefitted from it. Several groups of carnivorans such as dogs and cats underwent an adaptive radiation in South America after dispersing there, and the greatest modern diversity of canids in the world is in South America.

== Reasons for success or failure ==
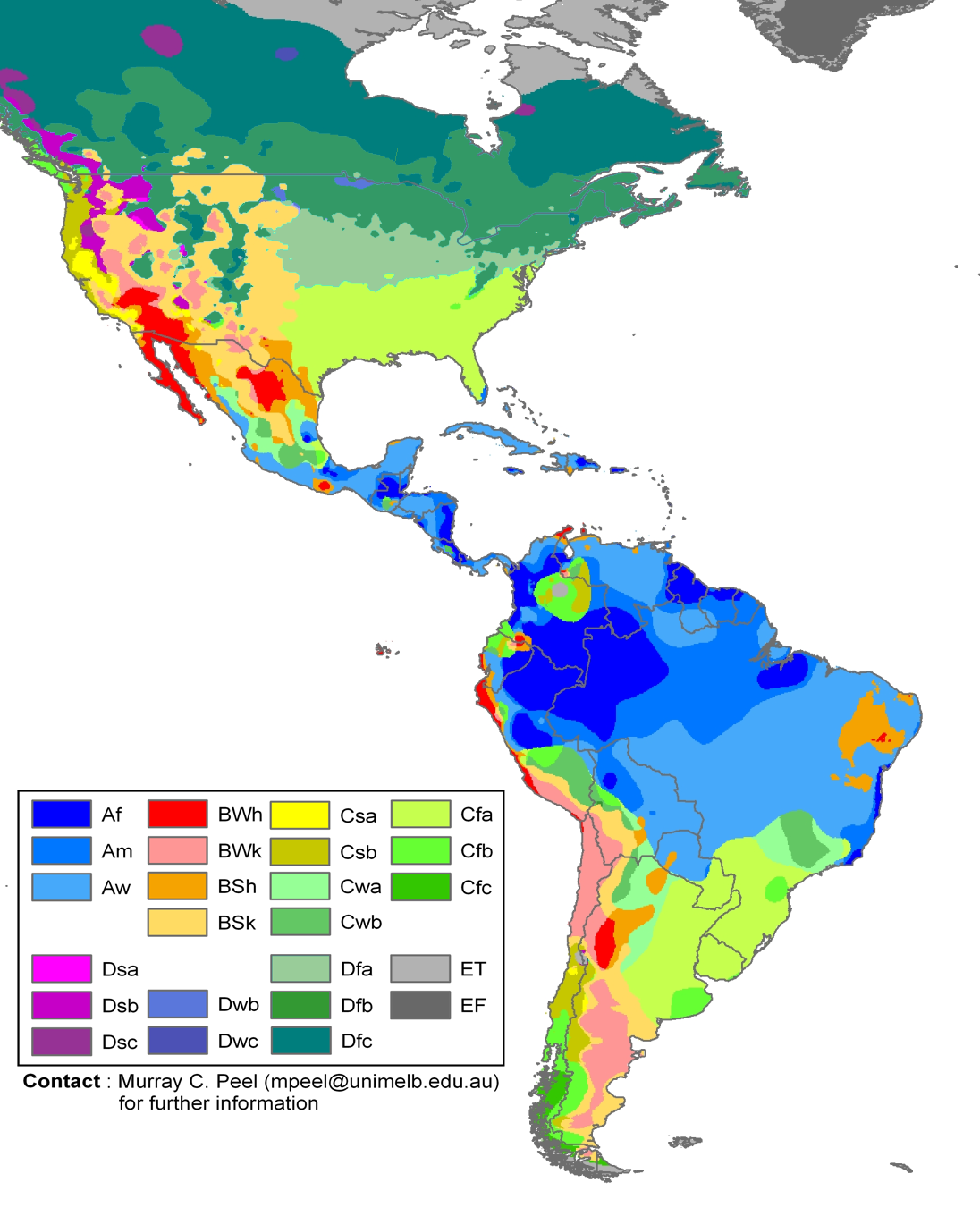
A north–south climatic asymmetry in the Americas: Tropical climate zones, which are warm year-round and moist at least part of the year (blue zones Af, Am and Aw), cover much of South America and nearly all of Central America, but very little of the rest of North America.

The eventual triumph of the Nearctic migrants was ultimately based on geography, which played into the hands of the northern invaders in two crucial respects. The first was a matter of climate. Any species that reached Panama from either direction obviously had to be able to tolerate moist tropical conditions. Those migrating southward would then be able to occupy much of South America without encountering climates that were markedly different. However, northward migrants would have encountered drier or cooler conditions by the time they reached the vicinity of the Trans-Mexican Volcanic Belt. The challenge this climatic asymmetry (see map on right) presented was particularly acute for Neotropic species specialized for tropical rainforest environments, which had little prospect of penetrating beyond Central America. As a result, Central America currently has 41 mammal species of Neotropical origin, (Note: The Central American species of South American origin (opossums, xenarthrans, caviomorph rodents and platyrrhine monkeys) are as follows: Central American opossum species: Derby's woolly opossum (Caluromys derbianus); Water opossum (Chironectes minimus); Common opossum (Didelphis marsupialis); Virginia opossum (Didelphis virginiana); Mexican mouse opossum (Marmosa mexicana); Robinson's mouse opossum (Marmosa robinsoni); Panama slender opossum (Marmosops invictus); Brown four-eyed opossum (Metachirus nudicaudatus); Alston's mouse opossum (Micoureus alstoni); Sepia short-tailed opossum (Monodelphis adusta); Gray four-eyed opossum (Philander opossum); Grayish mouse opossum (Tlacuatzin canescens); Central American xenarthran species: Nine-banded armadillo (Dasypus novemcinctus); Northern naked-tailed armadillo (Cabassous centralis); Pygmy three-toed sloth (Bradypus pygmaeus); Brown-throated sloth (Bradypus variegatus); Hoffmann's two-toed sloth (Choloepus hoffmanni); Silky anteater (Cyclopes didactylus); Giant anteater (Myrmecophaga tridactyla); Northern tamandua (Tamandua mexicana); Central American caviomorph rodent species: Rothschild's porcupine (Coendou rothschildi); Mexican hairy dwarf porcupine (Sphiggurus mexicanus); Lesser capybara (Hydrochoerus hydrochaeris); Coiban agouti (Dasyprocta coibae); Mexican agouti (Dasyprocta mexicana); Central American agouti (Dasyprocta punctata); Ruatan Island agouti (Dasyprocta ruatanica); Lowland paca (Cuniculus paca); Rufous soft-furred spiny-rat (Diplomys labilis); Armored rat (Hoplomys gymnurus); Tome's spiny-rat (Proechimys semispinosus); Central American platyrrhine monkey species: Coiba Island howler (Alouatta coibensis) – may be a subspecies of Alouatta palliata; Mantled howler (Alouatta palliata); Guatemalan black howler (Alouatta pigra); Panamanian night monkey (Aotus zonalis) – may be a subspecies of gray-bellied night monkey (Aotus lemurinus); Black-headed spider monkey (Ateles fusciceps); Geoffroy's spider monkey (Ateles geoffroyi); White-headed capuchin (Cebus capucinus); Geoffroy's tamarin (Saguinus geoffroyi); Cottontop tamarin (Saguinus oedipus) – possibly recently extirpated in Central America; Central American squirrel monkey (Saimiri oerstedii)) compared to only three for temperate North America. However, species of South American origin (marsupials, xenarthrans, caviomorph rodents, and monkeys) still comprise only 21% of species from nonflying, nonmarine mammal groups in Central America, while North American invaders constitute 49% of species from such groups in South America. Thus, climate alone cannot fully account for the greater success of species of Nearctic origin during the interchange.

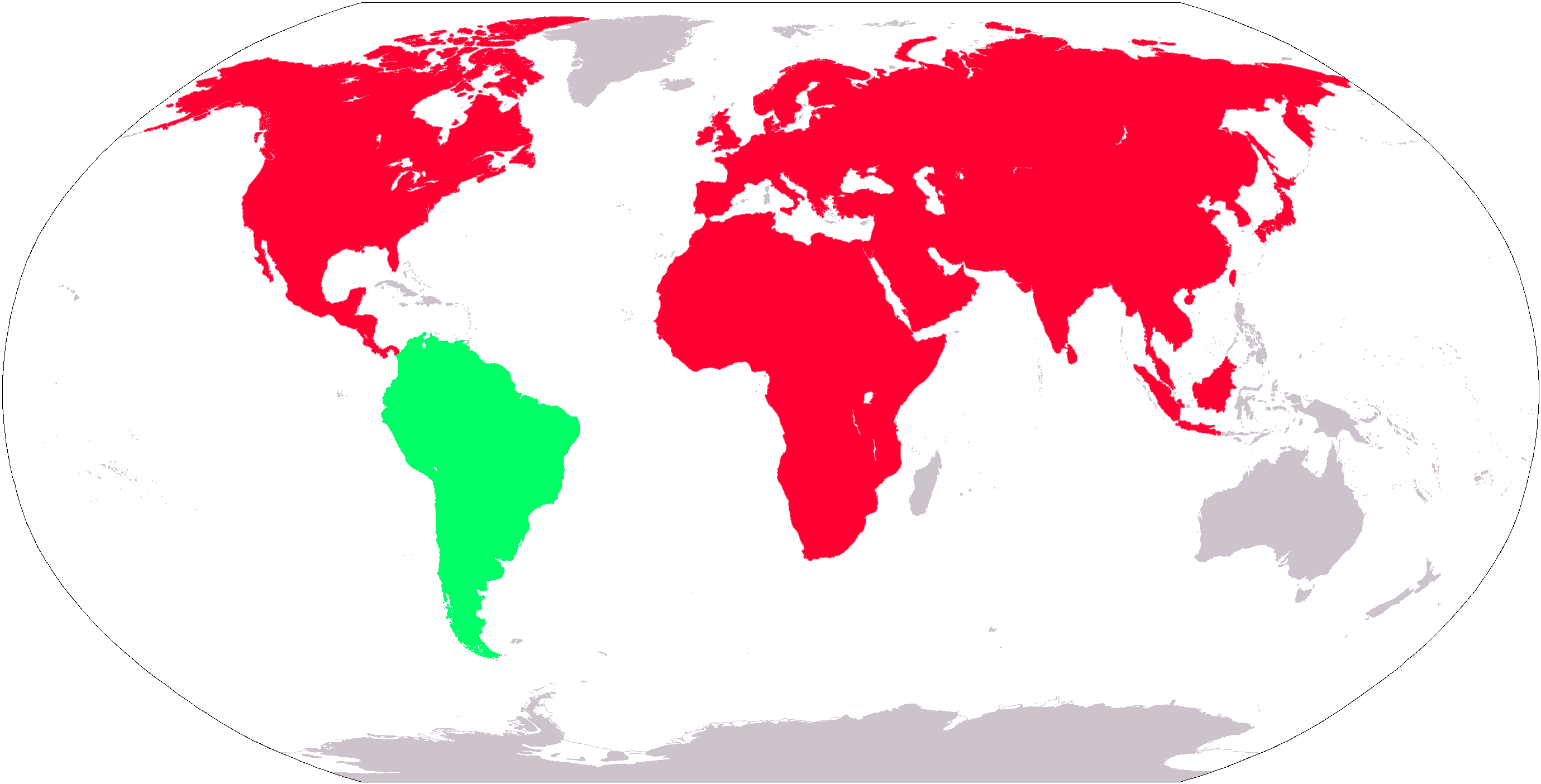
Land areas over which ancestors of Neotropic (green) and Nearctic (red) species could wander via two-way migrations during the latter part of the Cenozoic prior to the interchange: The smaller area available for Neotropic species to evolve in tended to put them at a competitive disadvantage.

The second and more important advantage geography gave to the northerners is related to the land area in which their ancestors evolved. During the Cenozoic, North America was periodically connected to Eurasia via Beringia, allowing repeated migrations back and forth to unite the faunas of the two continents. (Note: During the Miocene alone, between about 23 and 5 Ma ago, 11 episodes of invasions of North America from Eurasia have been recognized, bringing a total of 81 new genera into North America.) Eurasia was connected in turn to Africa, which contributed further to the species that made their way to North America. (Note: The combination of Africa, Eurasia and North America was termed the "World Continent" by George Gaylord Simpson.) South America, though, was connected only to Antarctica and Australia, two much smaller and less hospitable continents, and only in the early Cenozoic. Moreover, this land connection does not seem to have carried much traffic (apparently no mammals other than marsupials and perhaps a few monotremes ever migrated by this route), particularly in the direction of South America. This means that Northern Hemisphere species arose within a land area roughly six times greater than was available to South American species. North American species were thus products of a larger and more competitive arena, (Note: Simpson, 1950, p. 368) where evolution would have proceeded more rapidly. They tended to be more efficient and brainier, (Note: According to data on the EQ (encephalization quotient, a measure of the brain to body size ratio adjusted for the expected effect of differences in body size) of fossil ungulates compiled by H. Jerison, North American ungulates showed a trend towards greater EQs going from the Paleogene to the Neogene periods (average EQs of 0.43 and 0.64, respectively), while the EQs of South American ungulates were static over the same time interval (average EQ unchanged at 0.48). This analysis was later criticized. Jerison subsequently presented data suggesting that native South American ungulates also lagged in the relative size of their neocortices (a measurement not subject to the vagaries of body mass estimation). Interestingly, the late survivor Toxodon had one of the highest EQ values (0.88) among native Neotropic ungulates. Jerison also found that Neogene xenarthrans had low EQs, similar to those he obtained for South American ungulates.) (Note: The estimated EQ of Thylacosmilus atrox, 0.41 (based on a brain mass of 43.2 g, a body mass of 26.4 kg, and an EQ of 43.2/[0.12*26400^(2/3)]), is high for a sparassodont, but is lower than that of modern felids, with a mean value of 0.87. Estimates of 0.38 and 0.59 have been given for the EQ of much larger Smilodon fatalis (based on body mass estimates of 330 and 175 kg, respectively).) generally able to outrun and outwit their South American counterparts, who were products of an evolutionary backwater. In the cases of ungulates and their predators, South American forms were replaced wholesale by the invaders, possibly a result of these advantages.

The greater eventual success of South America's African immigrants compared to its native early Cenozoic mammal fauna is another example of this phenomenon, since the former evolved over a greater land area; their ancestors migrated from Eurasia to Africa, two significantly larger continents, before finding their way to South America.

Against this backdrop, the ability of South America's xenarthrans to compete effectively against the northerners represents a special case. The explanation for the xenarthrans' success lies in part in their idiosyncratic approach to defending against predation, based on possession of body armor or formidable claws. The xenarthrans did not need to be fleet-footed or quick-witted to survive. Such a strategy may have been forced on them by their low metabolic rate (the lowest among the therians). Their low metabolic rate may in turn have been advantageous in allowing them to subsist on less abundant or less nutritious food sources. Unfortunately, the defensive adaptations of the large xenarthrans would have offered little protection against humans armed with spears and other projectiles.

== Late Pleistocene extinctions ==
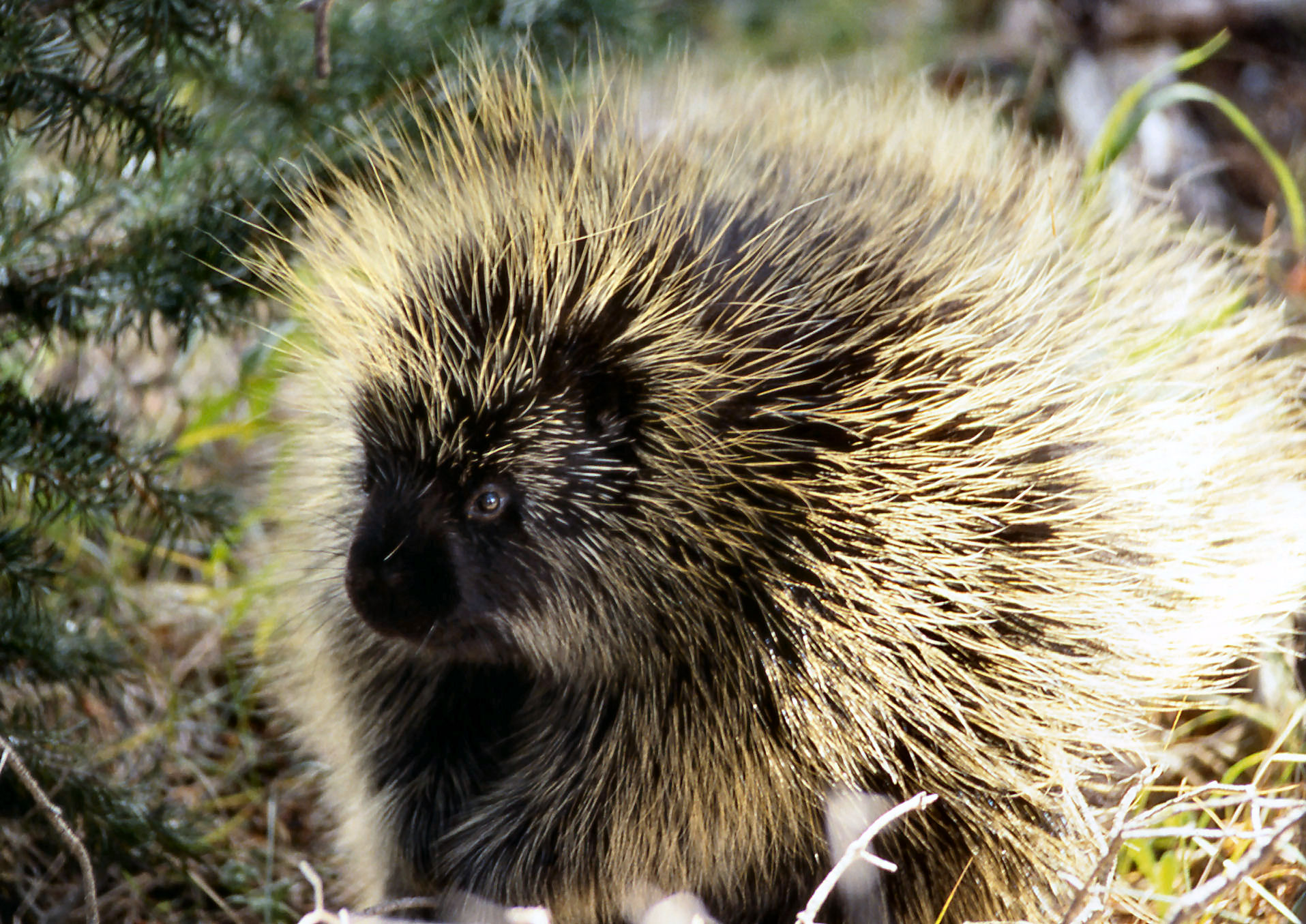
The North American porcupine, Erethizon dorsatum, the largest surviving Neotropic migrant to temperate North America

At the end of the Pleistocene epoch, about 12,000 years ago, three dramatic developments occurred in the Americas at roughly the same time (geologically speaking). Paleoindians invaded and occupied the New World (although humans may have been living in the Americas, including what is now the southern US and Chile, more than 15,000 years ago), the last glacial period came to an end, and a large fraction of the megafauna of both North and South America went extinct. This wave of extinctions swept off the face of the Earth many of the successful participants of the GABI, as well as other species that had not migrated.

All the pampatheres, glyptodonts, ground sloths, equids, proboscideans, giant short-faced bears, dire wolves, and machairodont species of both continents disappeared. The last of the South and Central American notoungulates and litopterns died out, as well as North America's giant beavers, lions, dholes, cheetahs, and many of its antilocaprid, bovid, cervid, tapirid and tayassuid ungulates. Some groups disappeared over most or all of their original range, but survived in their adopted homes, e.g. South American tapirs, camelids, and tremarctine bears (cougars and jaguars may have been temporarily reduced to South American refugia also). Others, such as capybaras, survived in their original range, but died out in areas to which they had migrated. Notably, this extinction pulse eliminated all Neotropic migrants to North America larger than about 15 kg (the size of a big porcupine), and all native South American mammals larger than about 65 kg (the size of a big capybara or giant anteater). In contrast, the largest surviving native North American mammal, the wood bison, can exceed 900 kg (2,000 lb), and the largest surviving Nearctic migrant to South America, Baird's tapir, can reach 400 kg (880 lb).

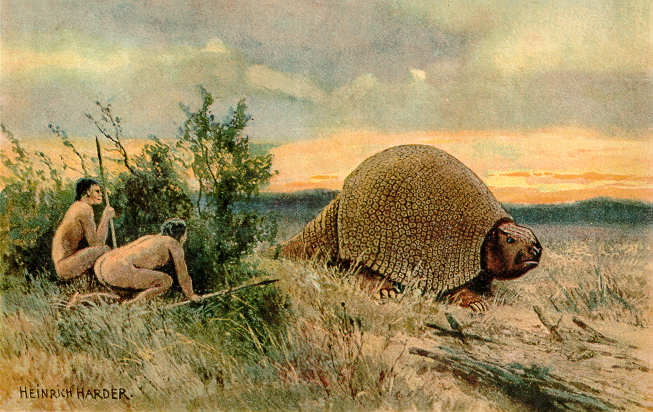
Paleo-Indians and †Glyptodon

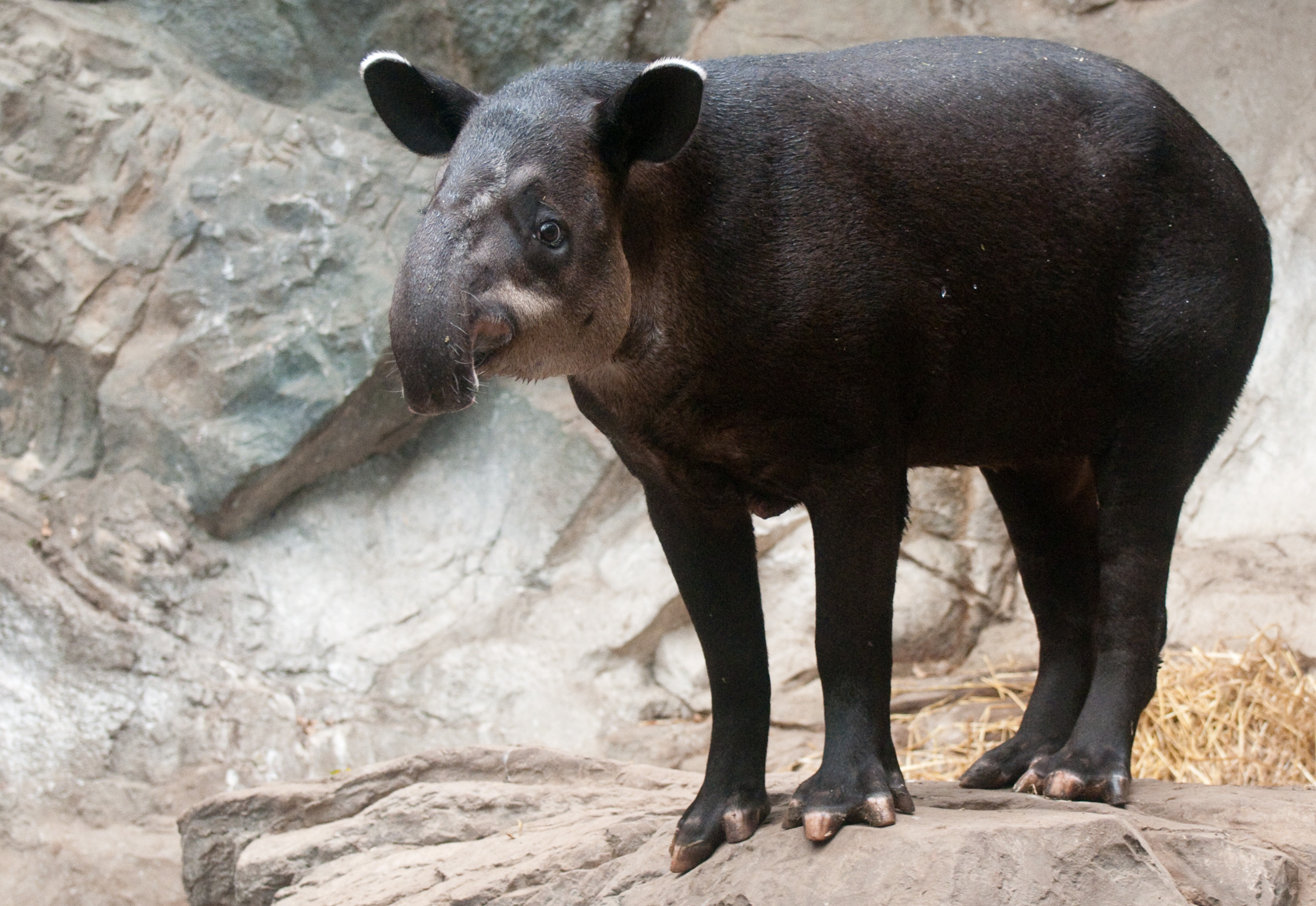
Baird's tapir, Tapirus bairdii, the largest surviving Nearctic migrant to South America

The near-simultaneity of the megafaunal extinctions with the glacial retreat and the peopling of the Americas has led to proposals that both climate change and human hunting played a role. Although the subject is contentious, a number of considerations suggest that human activities were pivotal. The extinctions did not occur selectively in the climatic zones that would have been most affected by the warming trend, and no plausible general climate-based megafauna-killing mechanism could explain the continent-wide extinctions. The climate change took place worldwide, but had little effect on the megafauna in Africa and southern Asia, where megafaunal species had coevolved with humans. Numerous very similar glacial retreats had occurred previously within the ice age of the last several million years without ever producing comparable waves of extinction in the Americas or anywhere else.

Similar megafaunal extinctions have occurred on other recently populated land masses (e.g. Australia, Japan, Madagascar, New Zealand, and many smaller islands around the world, such as Cyprus, Crete, Tilos and New Caledonia) at different times that correspond closely to the first arrival of humans at each location. These extinction pulses invariably swept rapidly over the full extent of a contiguous land mass, regardless of whether it was an island or a hemisphere-spanning set of connected continents. This was true despite the fact that all the larger land masses involved (as well as many of the smaller ones) contained multiple climatic zones that would have been affected differently by any climate changes occurring at the time. However, on sizable islands far enough offshore from newly occupied territory to escape immediate human colonization, megafaunal species sometimes survived for many thousands of years after they or related species became extinct on the mainland; examples include giant kangaroos in Tasmania, giant Chelonoidis tortoises of the Galápagos Islands (formerly also of South America), giant Dipsochelys tortoises of the Seychelles (formerly also of Madagascar), giant meiolaniid turtles on Lord Howe Island, New Caledonia and Vanuatu (previously also of Australia), (Note: The giant tortoises of Asia and Africa died out much earlier in the Quaternary than those of South America, Madagascar and Australia, while those of North America died out around the same time.) ground sloths on the Antilles, Steller's sea cows off the Commander Islands and woolly mammoths on Wrangel Island and Saint Paul Island.

The glacial retreat may have played a primarily indirect role in the extinctions in the Americas by simply facilitating the movement of humans southeastward from Beringia to North America. The reason that a number of groups went extinct in North America but lived on in South America (while no examples of the opposite pattern are known) appears to be that the dense rainforest of the Amazon basin and the high peaks of the Andes provided environments that afforded a degree of protection from human predation. (Note: P. S. Martin (2005), p. 175.) (Note: A number of recently extinct North American (and in some cases also South American) taxa such as tapirs, equids, camelids, saiga antelope, proboscids, dholes, and lions survived in the Old World, probably mostly for different reasons – tapirs being a likely exception, since their Old World representative survived only in the rainforests of Southeast Asia. (Cheetahs in the broadest sense could be added to this list, although the New and Old World forms are in different genera.) Old World herbivores may in many cases have been able to learn to be vigilant about the presence of humans during a more gradual appearance (by development or migration) of advanced human hunters in their ranges. In the cases of predators, the Old World representatives in at least some locations would thus have suffered less from extinctions of their prey species. In contrast, the musk ox represents a rare example of a megafaunal taxon that recently became extinct in Asia, but survived in remote areas of arctic North America (its more southerly-distributed relatives, such as the woodland muskox and shrub-ox, were less fortunate).)

== List of North American species of South American origin ==
=== Distributions beyond Mexico ===
Extant or extinct (†) North American taxa whose ancestors migrated out of South America and reached the modern territory of the contiguous United States: (Note: This listing currently has fairly complete coverage of mammals, but only spotty coverage of other groups. Crossings by nonflying mammals and birds occurred during the last 10 Ma. Crossings by fish, arthropods, rafting amphibians and reptiles, and flying bats and birds were made before 10 Ma ago in many cases. Taxa listed as invasive did not necessarily cross the isthmus themselves; they may have evolved in the adopted land mass from ancestral taxa that made the crossing.)

Fish

- Cichlids (Cichlidae: e.g. Texas cichlid) – freshwater fish that often tolerate brackish conditions

Amphibians

- Bufonid toads (Bufo)
- Hylid frogs
- Leptodactylid frogs – as far north as Texas
- Microhylid frogs

Birds

- Parrots (Neotropical parrots: thick-billed parrot, †Carolina parakeet)
- †Terror birds (Phorusrhacidae: Titanis walleri)
- Tanagers (Thraupidae)
- Hummingbirds (Trochilidae)
- Suboscine birds (Tyranni):
  - Tityras and allies (Tityridae): rose-throated becard
  - Tyrant flycatchers (Tyrannidae)

Mammals

- Virginia opossum (Didelphis virginiana)
- Xenarthrans (Xenarthra)
  - Armadillos (nine-banded armadillo Dasypus novemcinctus, †D. bellus)
  - †Pachyarmatherium leiseyi, an enigmatic armored armadillo relative
  - †Pampatheres (Plaina, Holmesina) – large armadillo-like animals
  - †Glyptodonts (Glyptotherium)
  - †Megalonychid ground sloths (Pliometanastes, Megalonyx)
  - †Megatheriid ground sloths (Eremotherium)
  - †Mylodontid ground sloths (Thinobadistes, Glossotherium, Paramylodon)
  - †Nothrotheriid ground sloths (Nothrotheriops, Nothrotherium)
- Rodents (Rodentia)
  - New World porcupines (Erethizon dorsatum, †Erethizon poyeri, †E. kleini)
  - Capybaras (†Neochoerus pinckneyi, †N. aesopi, †Hydrochoerus hesperotiganites)
- †Mixotoxodon – a rhino-sized toxodontid notoungulate (Note: Mixotoxodon remains have been collected in Central America and Mexico as far north as Veracruz and Michoacán, with a possible find in Tamaulipas; additionally, one fossil tooth has been identified in eastern Texas, United States.)
- Bats (Chiroptera)
  - Molossid bats
  - Mormoopid bats (Mormoops megalophylla)
  - Vampire bats (†Desmodus stocki, †D. archaeodaptes)
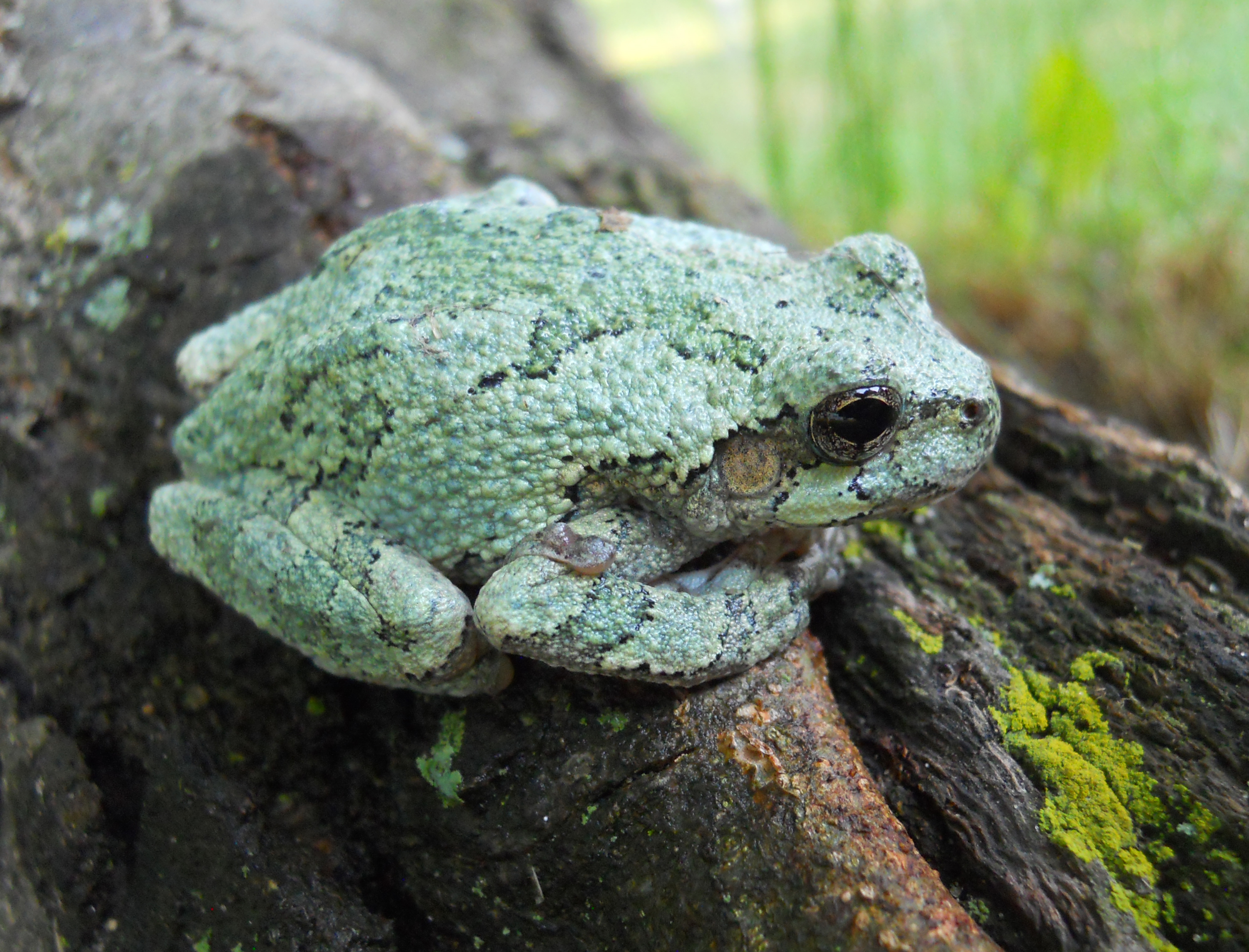
Gray tree frog, Hyla versicolor

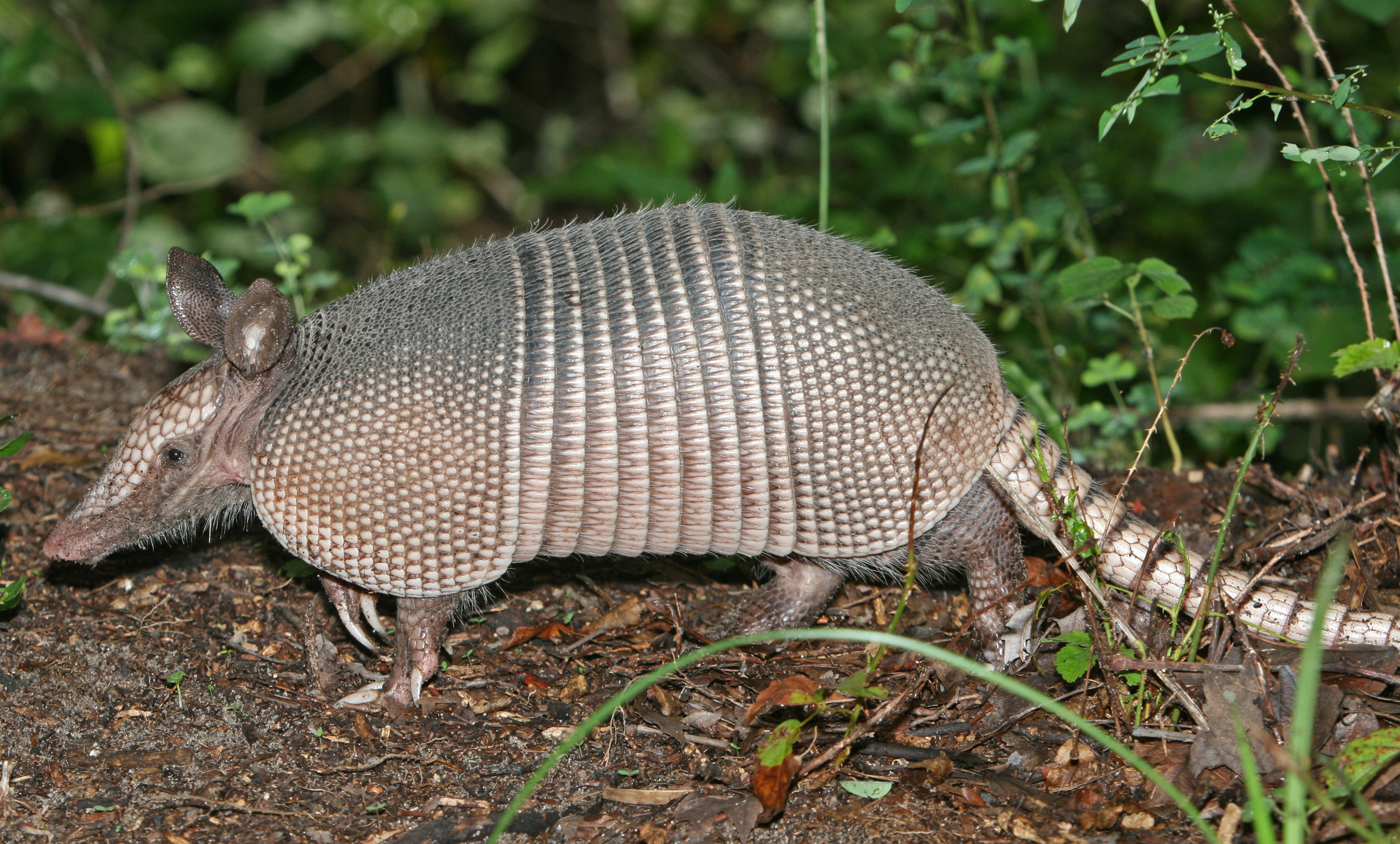
Nine-banded armadillo, Dasypus novemcinctus

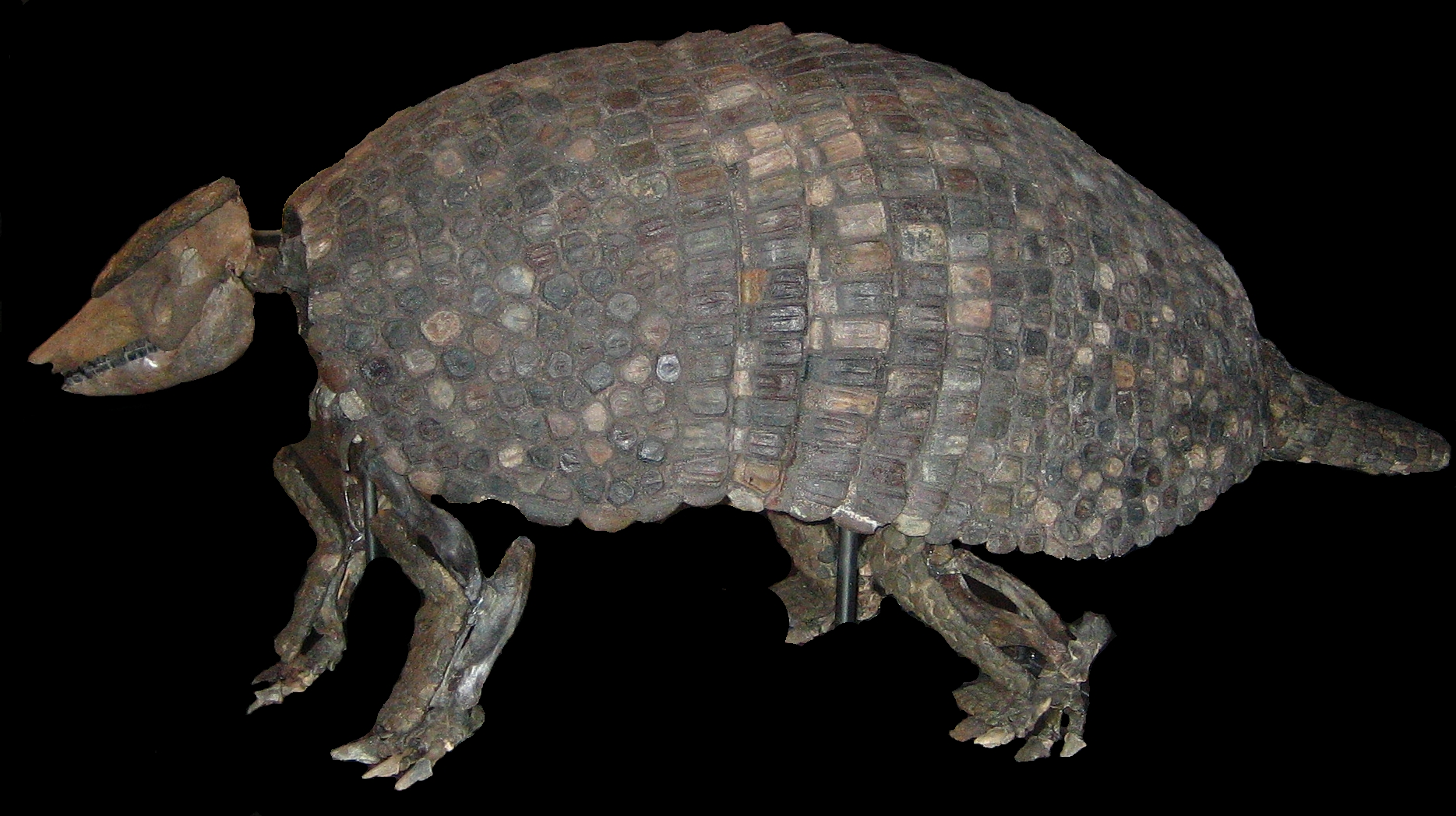
The pampathere †Holmesina septentrionalis

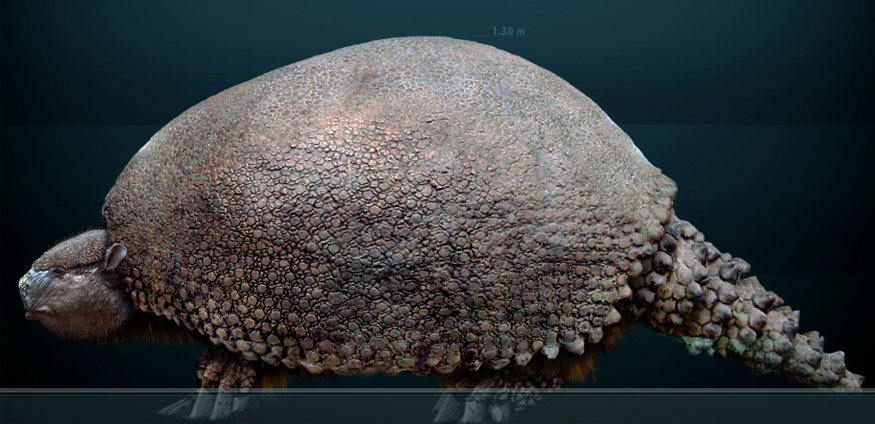
The glyptodont †Glyptotherium

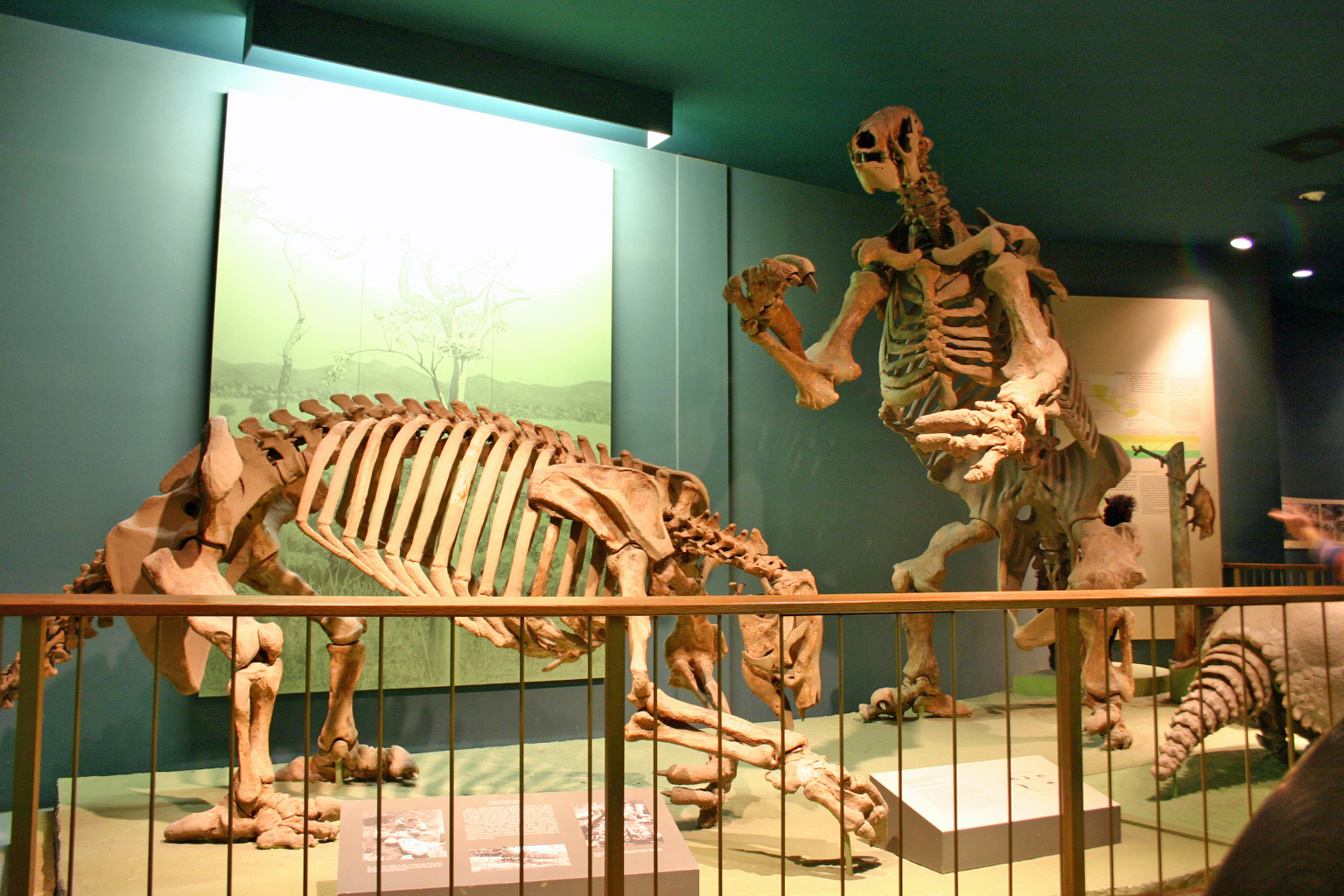
The megatheriid ground sloth †Eremotherium

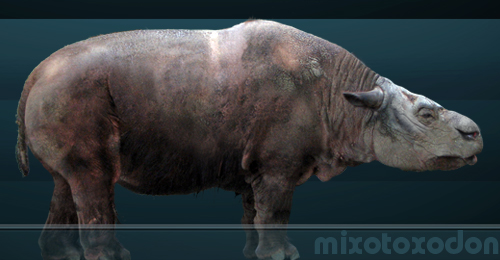
The toxodontid †Mixotoxodon

=== Distributions restricted to Mexico and Central America ===
Extant or extinct (†) North American taxa whose ancestors migrated out of South America, but failed to reach the contiguous United States and were confined to Mexico and Central America: (Note: Central America is usually defined physiographically as ending at the Isthmus of Tehuantepec or less commonly, at the Trans-Mexican Volcanic Belt. Most of the taxa that proceeded farther but failed to reach the present Mexican border are or were confined to tropical or subtropical climates similar to those of Central America. Examples include the giant anteater, the grayish mouse opossum, the lowland paca, and Geoffroy's spider monkey.)

Invertebrates

- Gonyleptid harvestmen (Opiliones: Gonyleptidae)

Fish

- Electric knifefishes (Gymnotiformes)
- Hoplosternum punctatum – an armored catfish (Siluriformes: Callichthyidae)
- Several species of loricariid catfish (Siluriformes: Loricariidae)

Amphibians

- Caeciliid caecilians (Caecilia, Oscaecilia) – snake-like amphibians, Panama and Costa Rica only
- Poison dart frogs (Dendrobatidae)

Reptiles

- Boine boas (Boidae: Boinae)
- Spectacled caiman (Caiman crocodilus)
- †Purussaurus – giant caimans

Birds

- Great curassow (Crax rubra)
- Toucans (Ramphastidae)
- Tinamous (Tinamidae)
- Additional suboscine birds (Tyranni):
  - Gnateaters (Conopophagidae)
  - Cotingas (Cotingidae)
  - Ground antbirds (Formicariidae)
  - Ovenbirds and woodcreepers (Furnariidae)
  - Antpittas (Grallariidae)
  - Manakins (Pipridae)
  - Tapaculos (Rhinocryptidae)
  - Antbirds (Thamnophilidae)
  - Other Neotropical parrots (Arinae)

Mammals

- Other opossums (Didelphidae) – 11 additional extant species
- Xenarthrans (Xenarthra)
  - Northern naked-tailed armadillo (Cabassous centralis)
  - Three-toed sloths (Bradypodidae: Bradypus variegatus, B. pygmaeus)
  - Hoffmann's two-toed sloth (Choloepodidae: Choloepus hoffmanni)
  - †Scelidotheriid ground sloths (Scelidotherium, found in Panama)
  - Silky anteater (Cyclopedidae: Cyclopes dorsalis)
  - Other anteaters (Myrmecophagidae: Myrmecophaga tridactyla, (Note: Fossils of the giant anteater have been found as far north as northwestern Sonora, Mexico.) Tamandua mexicana)
- Rodents (Rodentia)
  - Rothschild's and Mexican hairy dwarf porcupines (Coendou rothschildi, Sphiggurus mexicanus)
  - Other caviomorph rodents (Caviomorpha) – 9 additional extant species
- Platyrrhine monkeys (Platyrrhini) – at least 8 extant species (Note: It has been proposed that monkeys invaded Central America in at least three and probably four waves, as follows: (1) an initial invasion by A. pigra and S. oerstedii ~ 3 Ma ago; (2) an invasion by A. palliata (giving rise to A. coibensis), A. geoffroyi and C. capucinus ~ 2 Ma ago; an invasion by A. zonalis and S. geoffroyi ~ 1 Ma ago; a most recent invasion by A. fusciceps. The species of the first wave have apparently been out-competed by those of the second, and now have much more restricted distributions.)
- Carnivorans (Carnivora)
  - Olingos (Bassaricyon) – thought to have arisen in the Andes of northwest South America after their procyonid ancestors invaded from the north, before diversifying and migrating back to Central America
  - South American short-faced bears (Tremarctinae: †Arctotherium wingei) – thought to have invaded to as far as the Yucatán after arising in South America from North American ancestors
  - South American canids (Caninae: †Protocyon troglodytes) – thought to have invaded to as far as the Yucatán after arising in South America from North American ancestors
- Bats (Chiroptera)
  - Emballonurid bats
  - Furipterid bats (Furipterus horrens)
  - Other mormoopid bats
  - Noctilionid bats (Noctilio albiventris, Noctilio leporinus)
  - Other phyllostomid bats, including all 3 extant vampire bat species (Desmodontinae)
  - Thyropterid bats (Thyroptera discifera, Thyroptera tricolor)
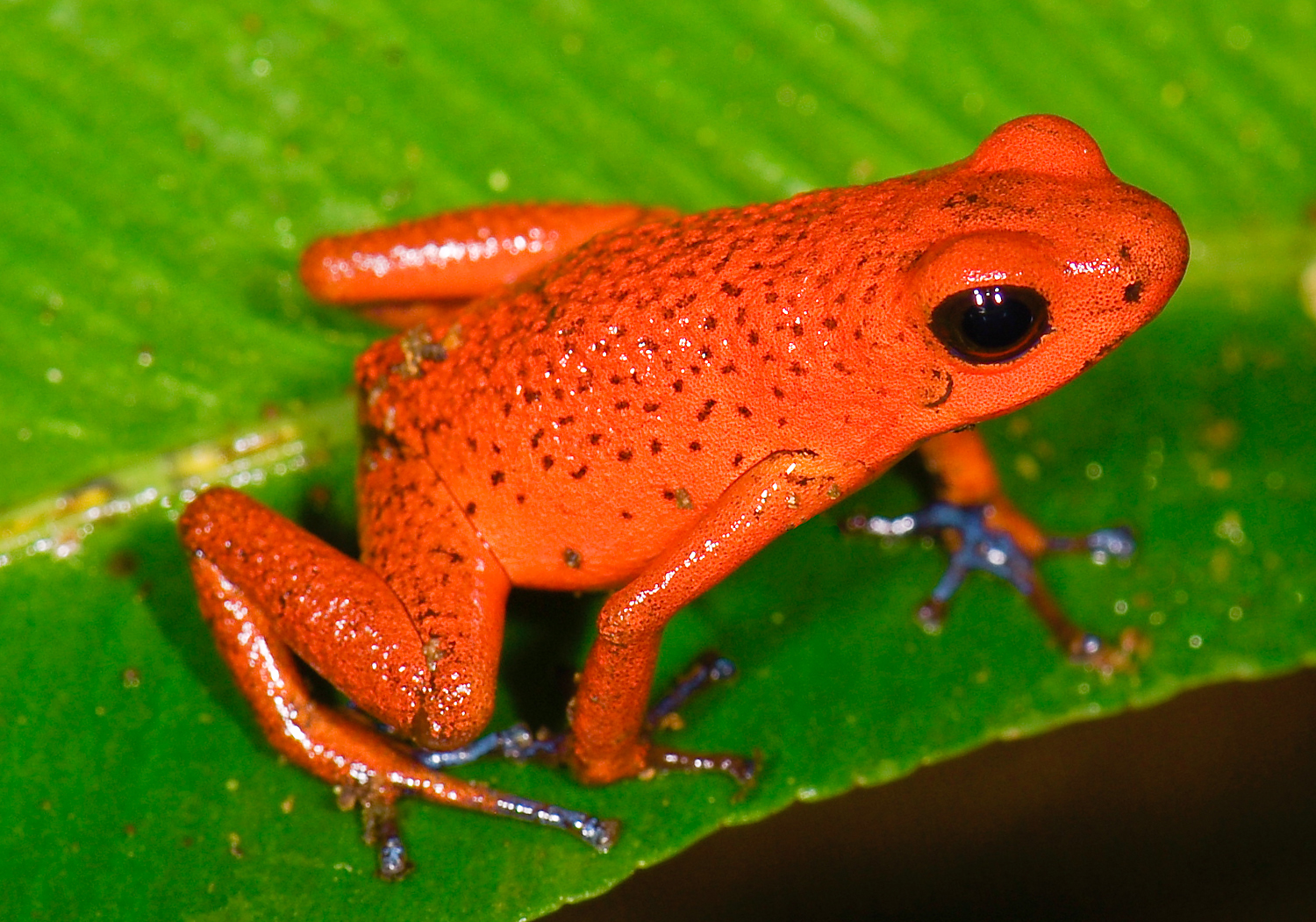
Strawberry poison-dart frog, Oophaga pumilio

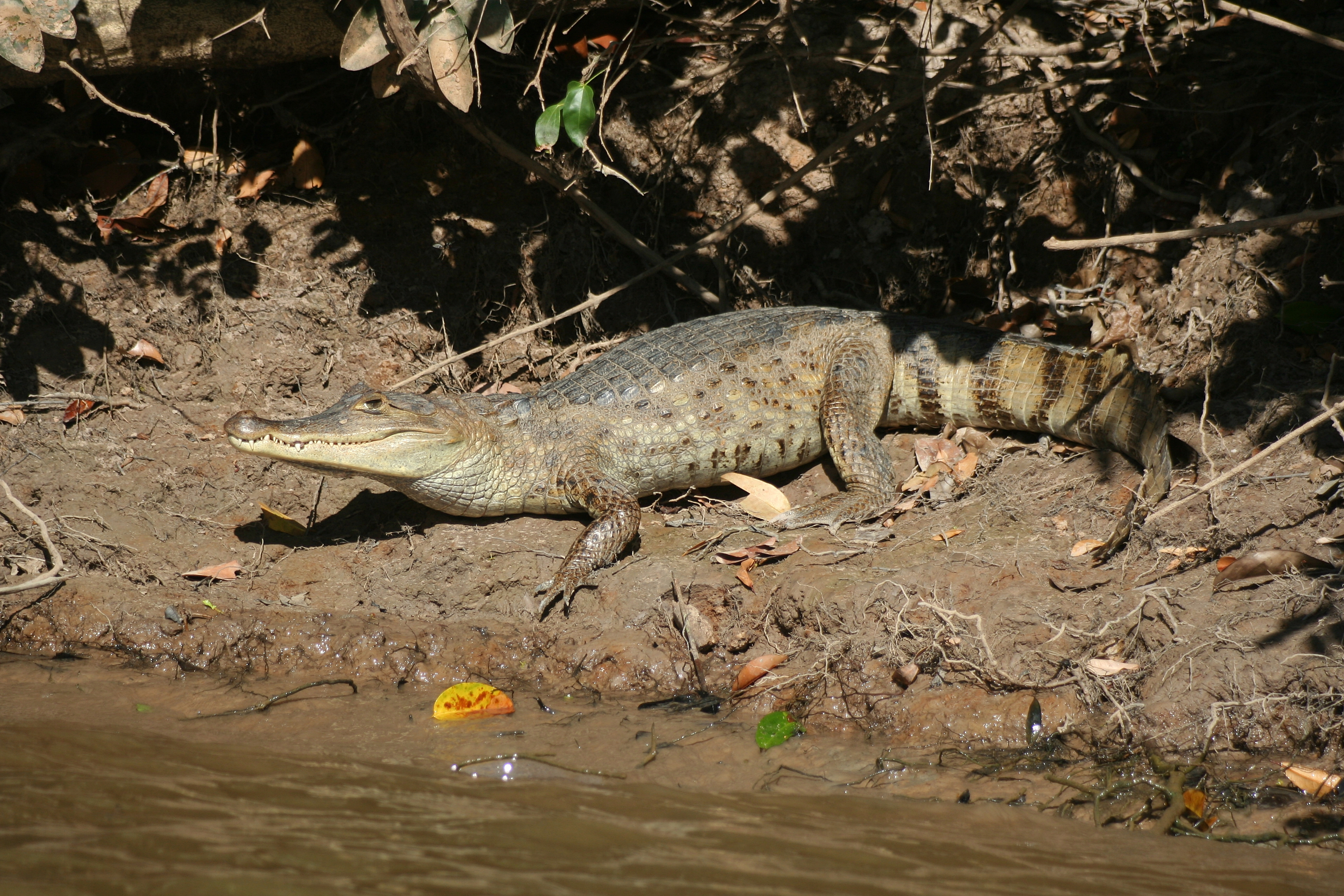
Spectacled caiman, Caiman crocodilus

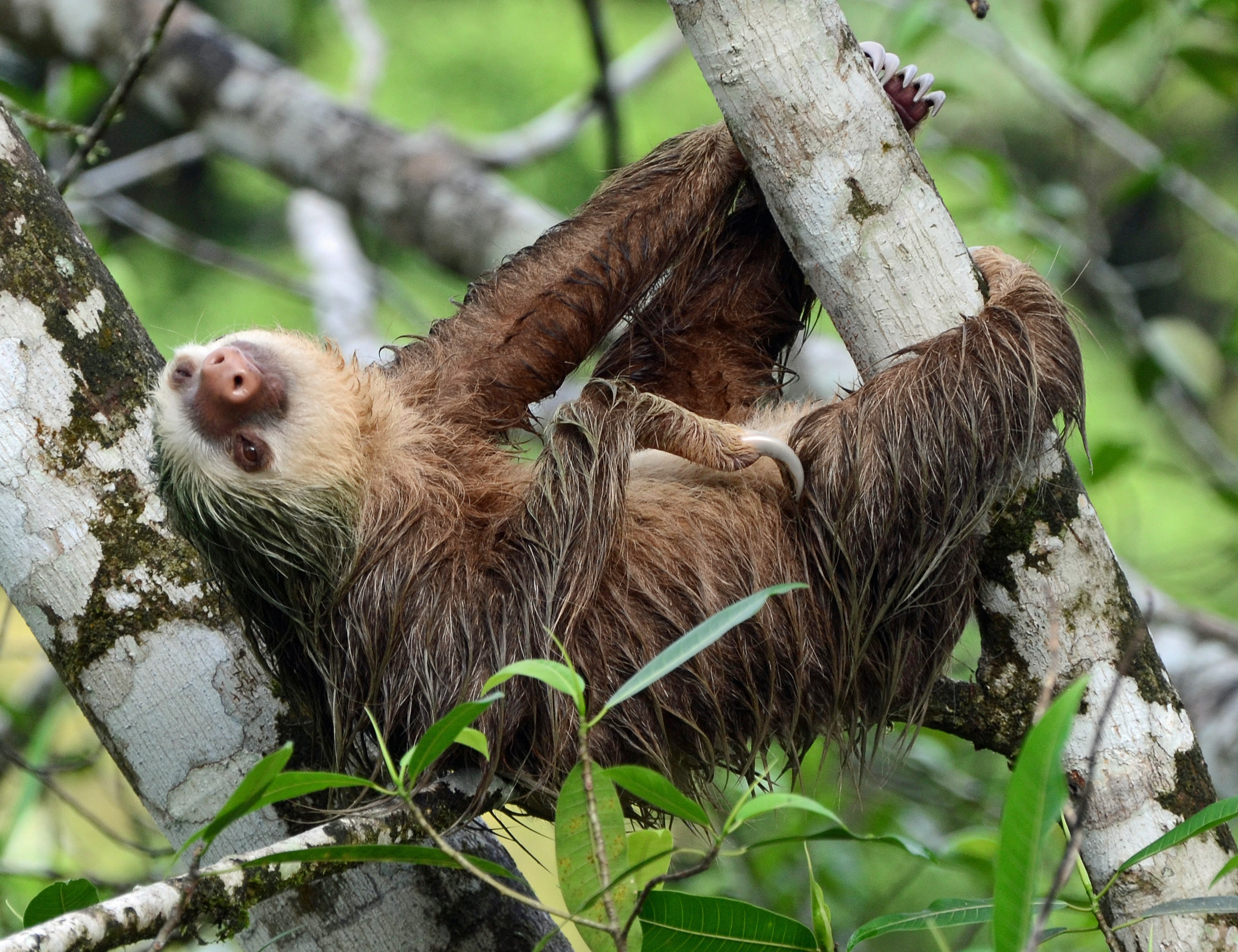
The two-toed sloth Choloepus hoffmanni

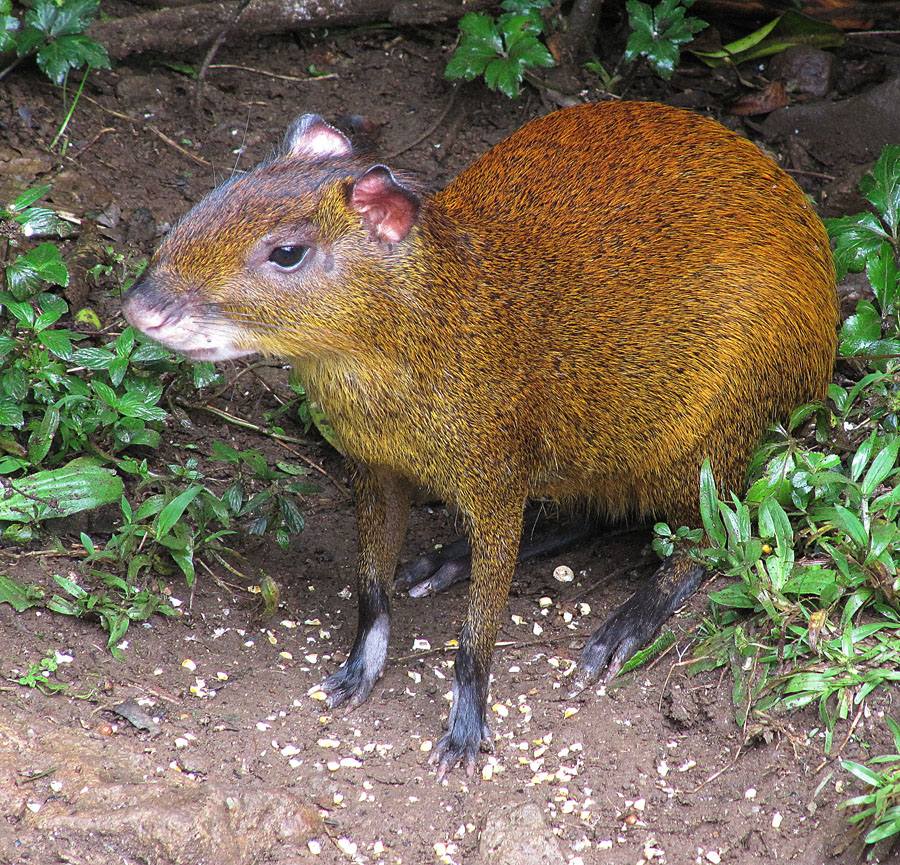
Central American agouti, Dasyprocta punctata

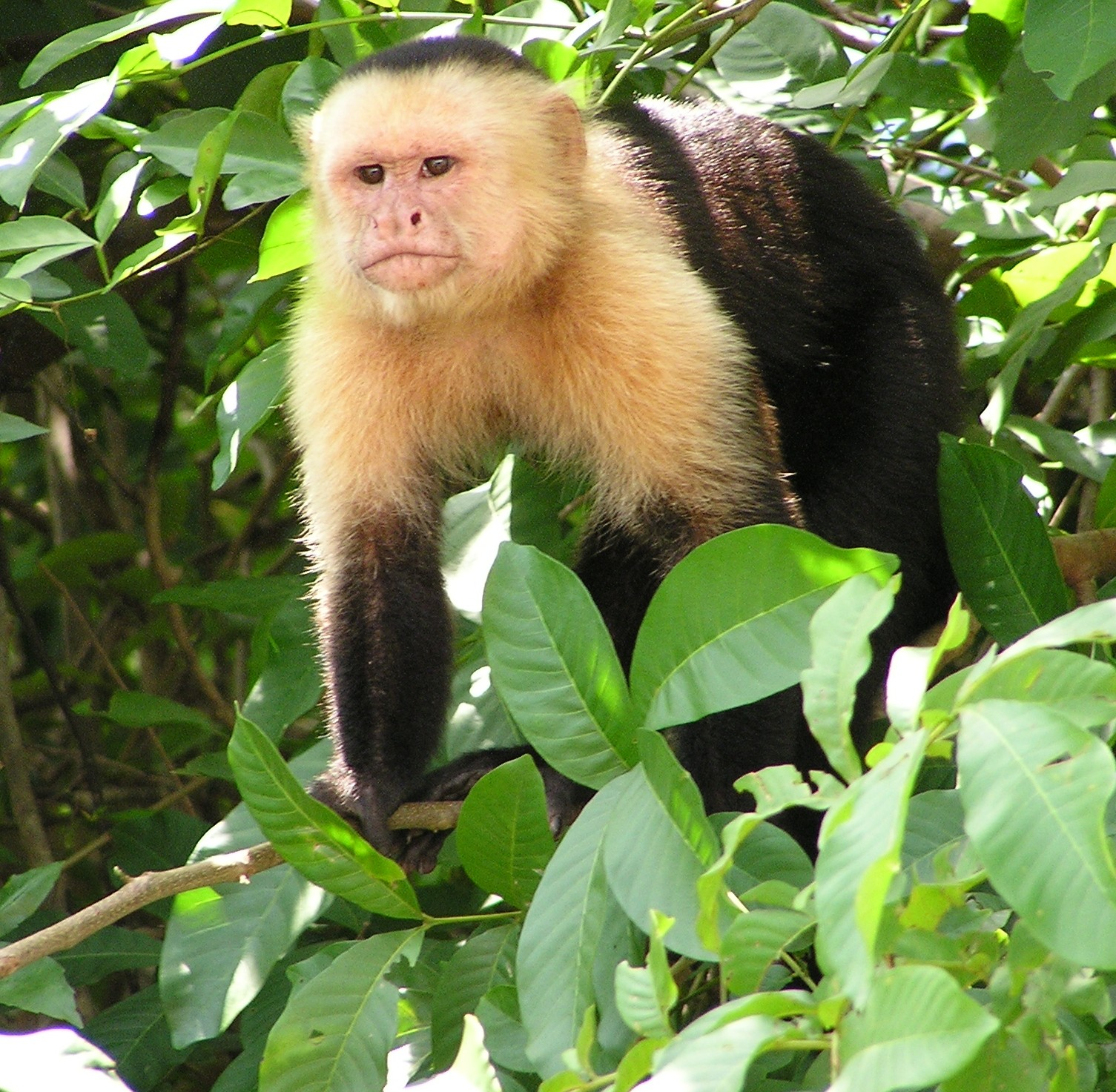
White-headed capuchin, Cebus capucinus

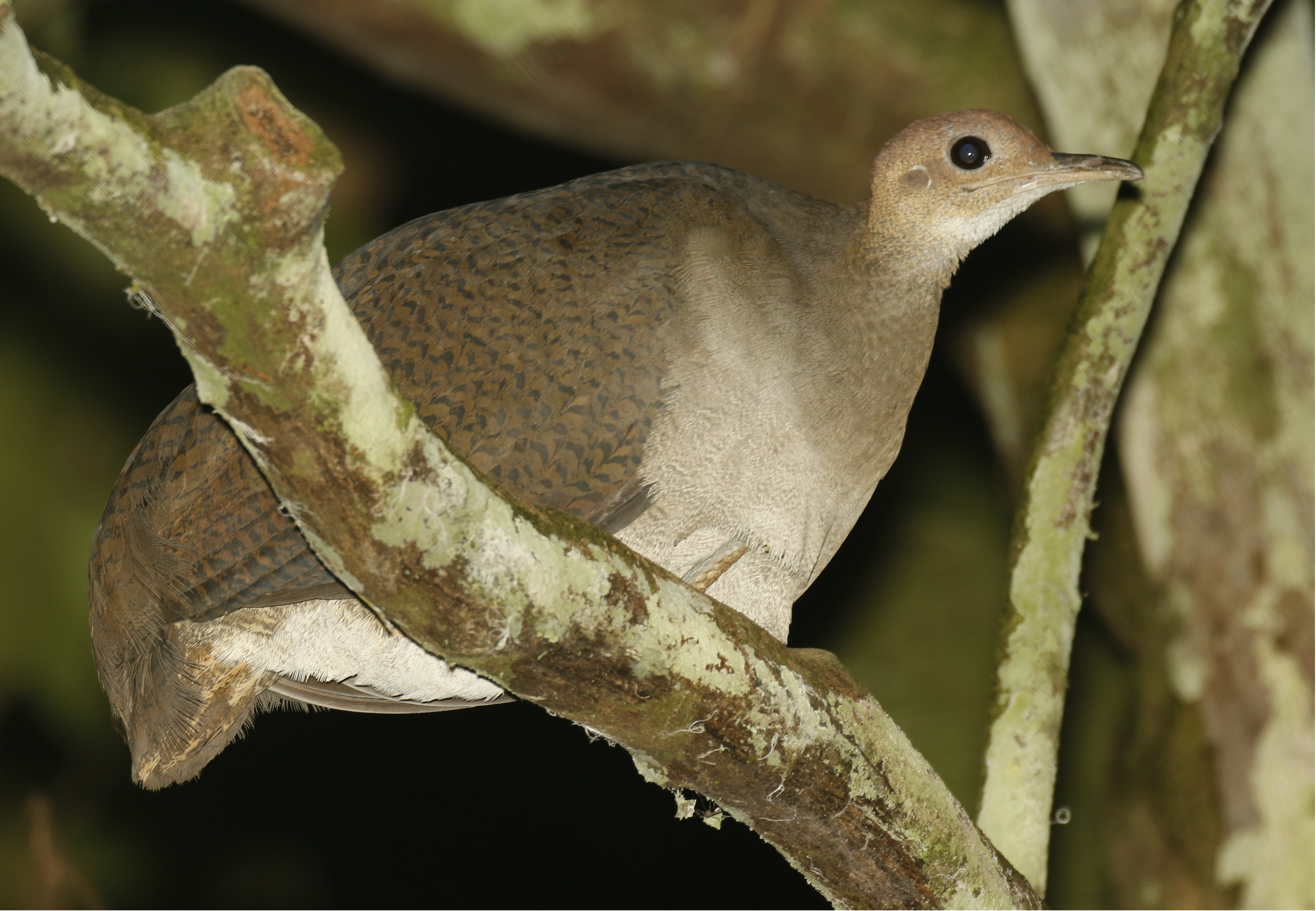
Great tinamou, Tinamus major

== List of South American species of North American origin ==
Extant or extinct (†) South American taxa whose ancestors migrated out of North America:

Amphibians

- Dermophiid caecilians (Dermophis glandulosus) – only present in northwestern Colombia
- Lungless salamanders (Note: Salamanders apparently dispersed to South America by the Early Miocene, about 23 Ma ago. Nevertheless, the salamander fauna of South America, which is restricted to the tropical region, consists of only 2 clades, and has fewer species and is far less diverse than that of much smaller Central America. Salamanders are believed to have originated in northern Pangea, perhaps not long before it separated to become Laurasia, and are not present anywhere else in the Southern Hemisphere (see the world salamander distribution map). In contrast, caecilians have a mostly Gondwanan distribution. Apart from a small region of overlap in southern China and northern Southeast Asia, Central America and northern South America are the only places in the world where both salamanders and caecilians are present.) (Bolitoglossa, Oedipina) – only present in northern South America
- Ranid frogs – only present in northern South America

Reptiles

- Turtles (Testudines)
  - Chelydrid (snapping) turtles (Chelydra acutirostris) – only present in northwestern South America
  - Emydid (pond) turtles (Trachemys)
  - Geoemydid (wood) turtles (Rhinoclemmys) – only present in northern South America
- Snakes (Serpentes)
  - Coral snakes (Leptomicrurus, Micrurus)
  - South American rattlesnake (Crotalus durissus)
  - Lanceheads (Bothrops)
  - Bushmasters (Lachesis)
  - Other pit vipers (Bothriechis schlegelii, Bothriopsis, Porthidium)

Birds

- American sparrows (Emberizidae)
- Trogons (Trogon)
- Condors (Vultur gryphus, †Dryornis, †Geronogyps, †Wingegyps, †Perugyps) (Note: Condors apparently reached South America by the late Miocene or early Pliocene (4.5 – 6.0 Ma ago), several million years before the formation of the isthmus. Condor-like forms in North America date back to the Barstovian stage (middle Miocene, 11.8 – 15.5 Ma ago).)

Mammals

- Small-eared shrews (Cryptotis) – only present in NW South America: Colombia, Venezuela, Ecuador, Peru
- Rodents (Rodentia)
  - Geomyid pocket gophers (Orthogeomys thaeleri) – one species, in Colombia
  - Heteromyid mice (Heteromys) – only present in NW South America: Colombia, Venezuela, Ecuador
  - Cricetid – primarily sigmodontine – rats and mice (Cricetidae: Sigmodontinae) – the nonsigmodontines consist of two species present only in Colombia and Ecuador (Note: This is based on the definition of Sigmodontinae that excludes Neotominae and Tylomyinae.)
  - Tree squirrels (Sciurus, Microsciurus, Sciurillus) – present in northern and central South America
- Cottontail rabbits (Sylvilagus brasiliensis, S. floridanus, S. varynaensis) – present in northern and central South America
- Odd-toed ungulates (Perissodactyla)
  - Tapirs (Tapirus bairdii, †T. cristatellus, T. pinchaque, †T. rondoniensis, T. terrestris)
  - Equids (Equus ferus, †Hippidion) (Note: Hippidion, a relatively short-legged equid that developed in South America after invading from North America about 2.5 Ma ago, has traditionally been thought to have evolved from pliohippines. However, recent studies of the DNA of Hippidion and other New World Pleistocene horses indicate that Hippidion is actually a member of Equus, closely related to the extant horse, E. ferus. Another invasion of South America by Equus occurred about one Ma ago, and this lineage, traditionally viewed as the subgenus Equus (Amerhippus), appears indistinguishable from E. ferus. Both these lineages became extinct at the end of the Pleistocene, but E. ferus was reintroduced from Eurasia by Europeans in the 16th century. Note: the authors of the DNA sequence study of Equus (Amerhippus) use "E. caballus" as an alternative specific name for "E. ferus".)
- Even-toed ungulates (Artiodactyla)
  - Peccaries (†Sylvochoerus, †Waldochoerus, Tayassu pecari, Catagonus wagneri, Dicotyles tajacu)
  - †Palaeomerycids (Surameryx)
  - Deer (†Antifer, †Morenelaphus, †Agalmaceros, Odocoileus, Blastocerus, Ozotoceros, Mazama, Pudu, Hippocamelus)
  - Camelids (Lama guanicoe, Vicugna vicugna, †Eulamaops, †Hemiauchenia, †Palaeolama)
- †Gomphotheres (Cuvieronius hyodon, Notiomastodon (Note: Not to be confused with the American mastodon (Mammut americanum), a proboscid from a different family whose remains have been found no further south than Honduras.) platensis) – elephant relatives
- Carnivorans (Carnivora)
  - Otters (Lontra, Pteronura)
  - Other mustelids (Mustelinae: Eira, Galictis, Lyncodon, Neogale)
  - Hog-nosed skunks (Conepatus chinga, C. humboldtii, C. semistriatus)
  - Procyonids (Procyon, Nasua, Nasuella, Potos, Bassaricyon, †Cyonasua, †Chapalmalania)
  - Short-faced bears (Tremarctinae: Tremarctos ornatus, †Arctotherium)
  - Wolves (†Canis gezi, †C. nehringi, †Aenocyon dirus – the latter known only from as far south as southern Bolivia)
  - Gray fox (Note: Not to be confused with the South American gray fox.) (Urocyon cinereoargenteus) – only present in NW South America: Colombia, Venezuela
  - Other canids (†Dusicyon, †Theriodictis, †Protocyon, Atelocynus, Cerdocyon, Lycalopex, Chrysocyon, Speothos)
  - Small felids (Leopardus) – all 9 extant species (e.g. L. pardalis, L. wiedii)
  - Cougar (Puma concolor) and jaguarundi (P. yagouaroundi)
  - Jaguar (Panthera onca)
  - †Scimitar cats (Xenosmilus, Homotherium) – known so far only from Uruguay and Venezuela
  - †Saber-toothed cats (Smilodon gracilis, S. fatalis, S. populator)
  - †American lion (Panthera leo atrox), reported from Peru and Argentina and Chile; however, the former set of remains has later been identified as belonging to a jaguar and the latter set of remains were initially identified as being from jaguars
- Bats (Chiroptera)
  - Natalid bats (Chilonatalus micropus, Natalus espiritosantensis, N. tumidirostris)
  - Vespertilionid bats

=== Image gallery ===
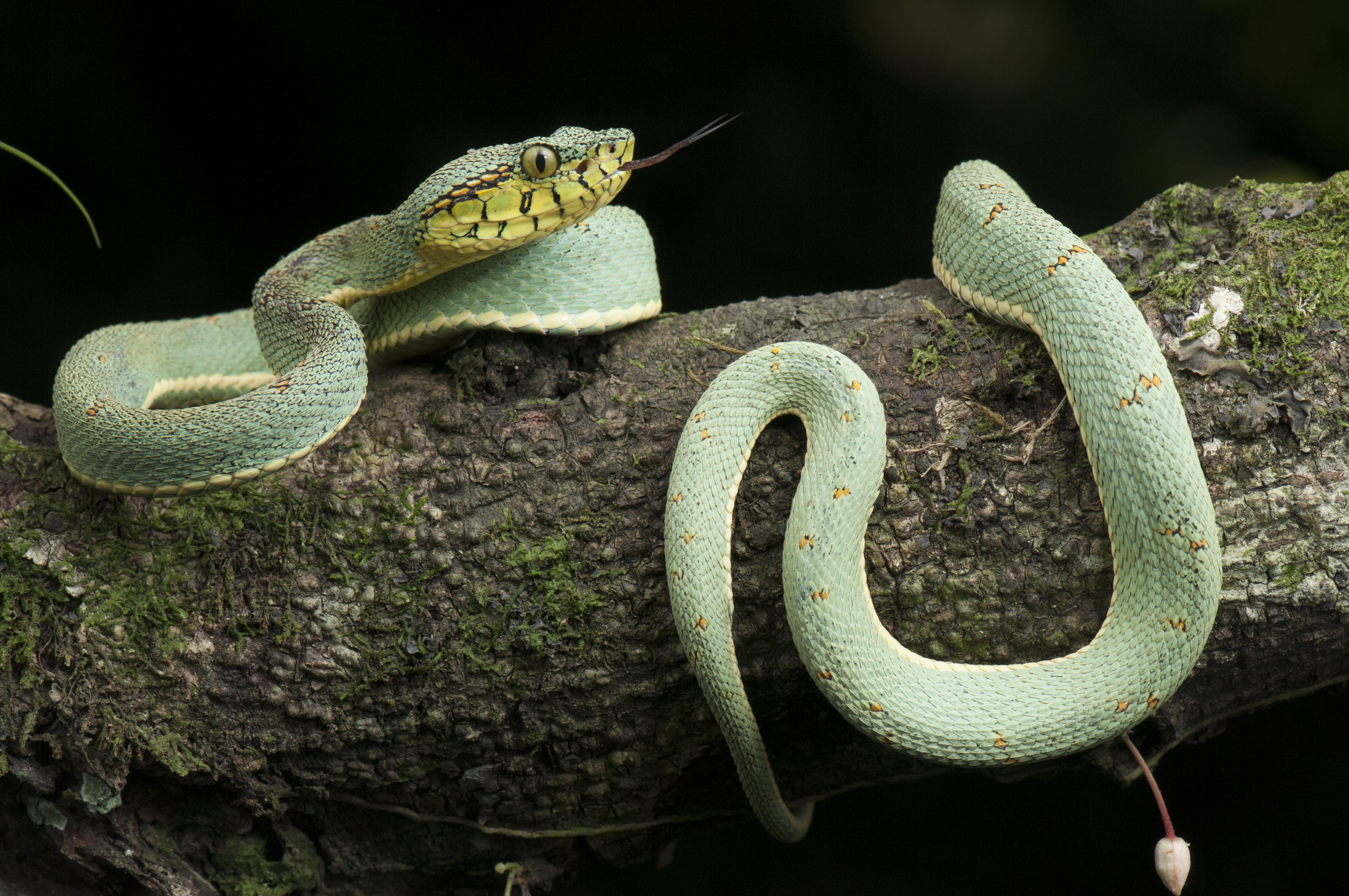
Amazonian palm viper, Bothrops bilineatus

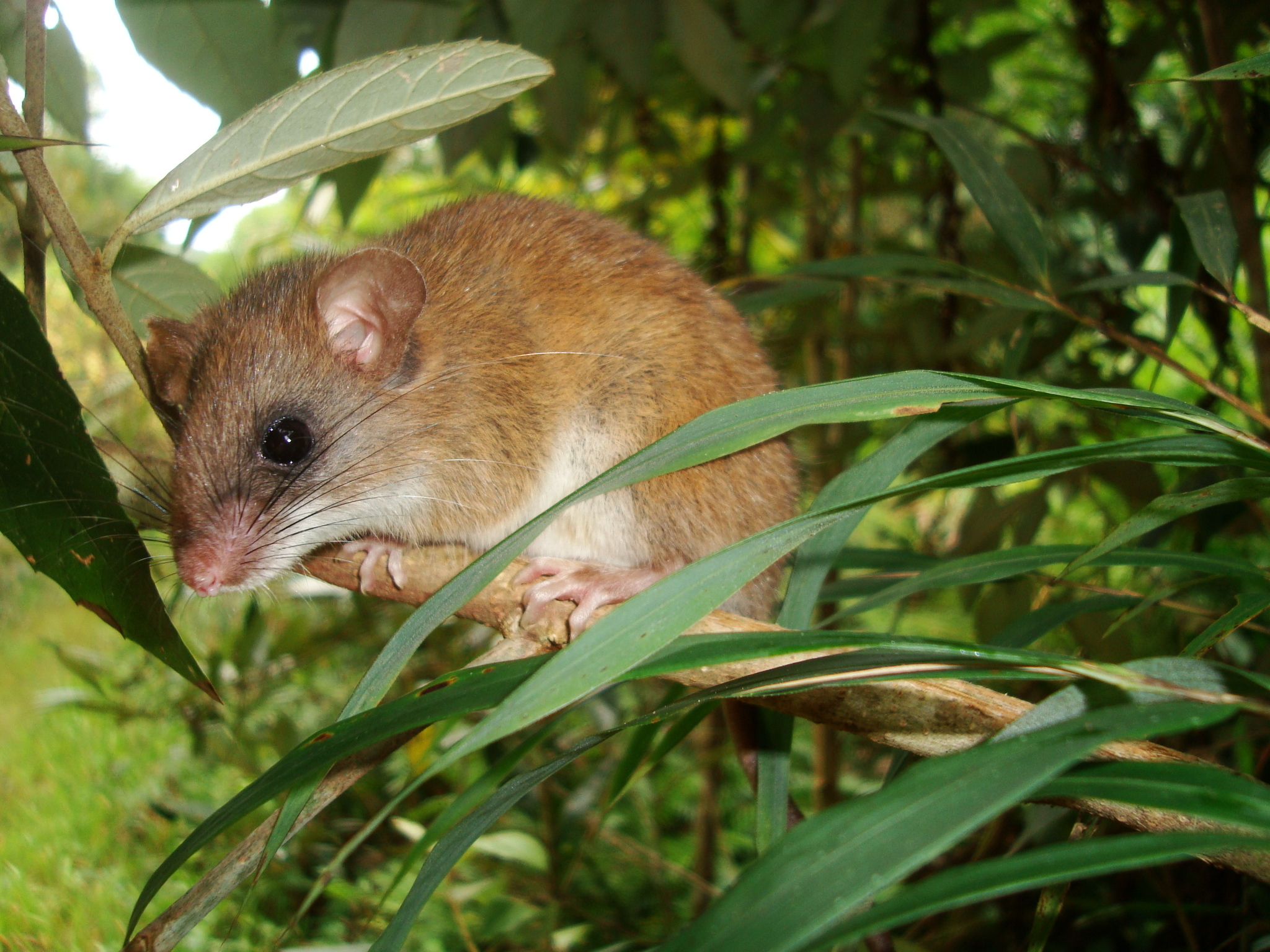
Drymoreomys albimaculatus, a sigmodontine rodent

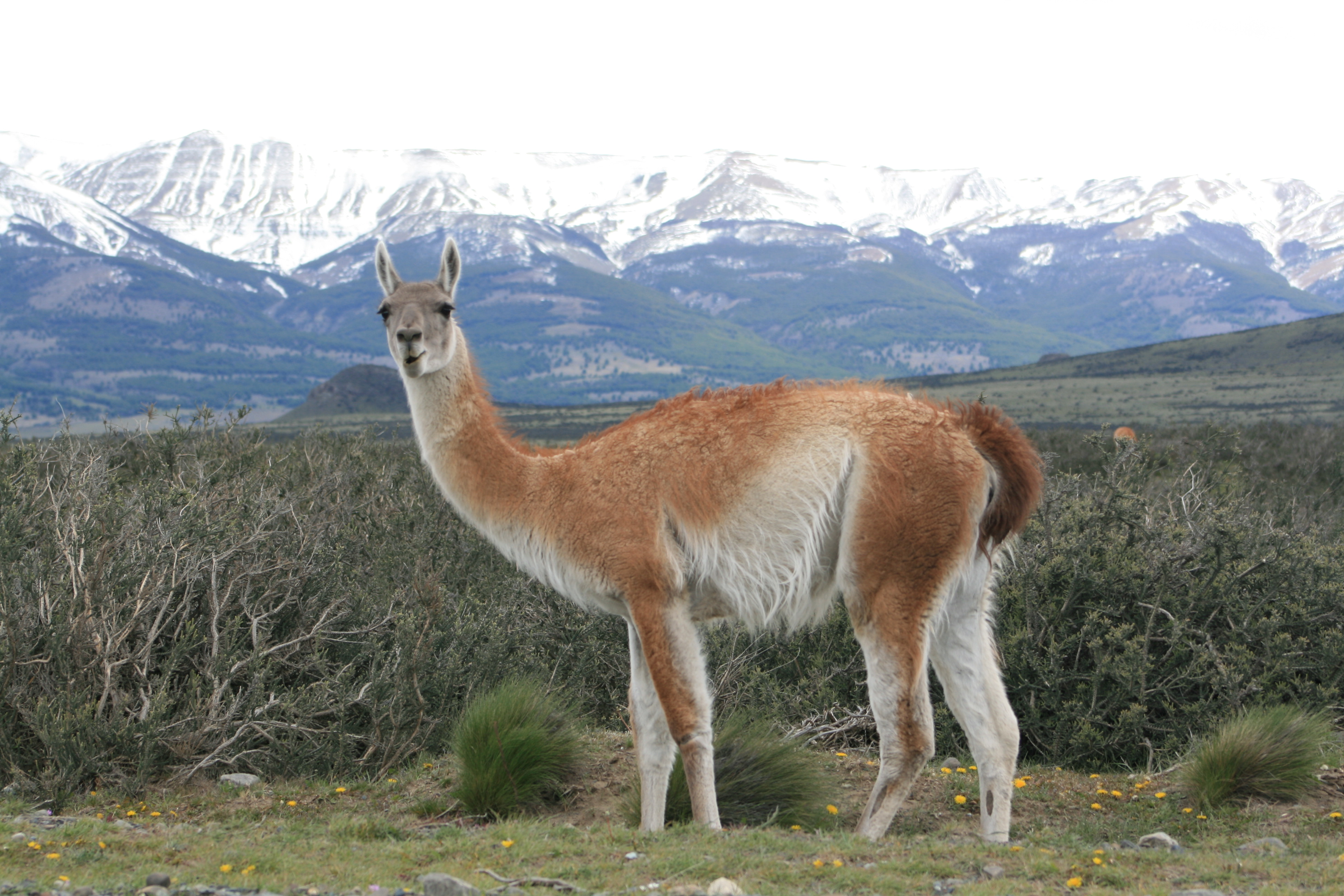
The camelid Lama guanicoe

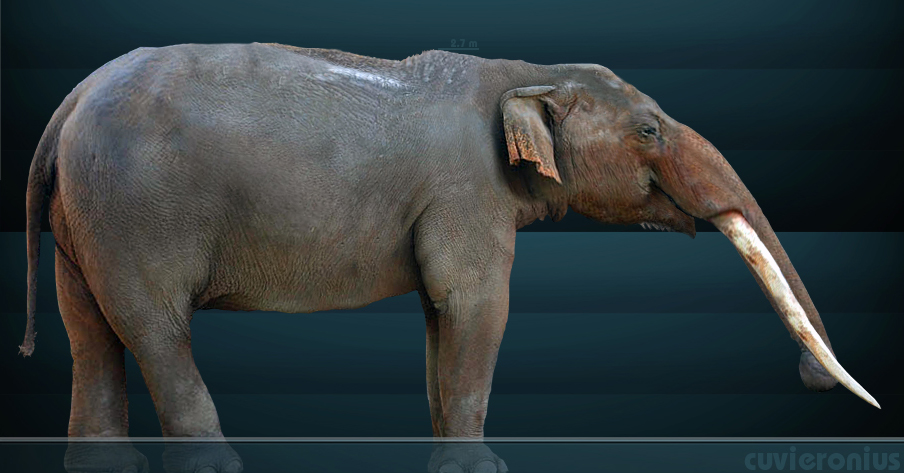
†Cuvieronius, a gomphothere

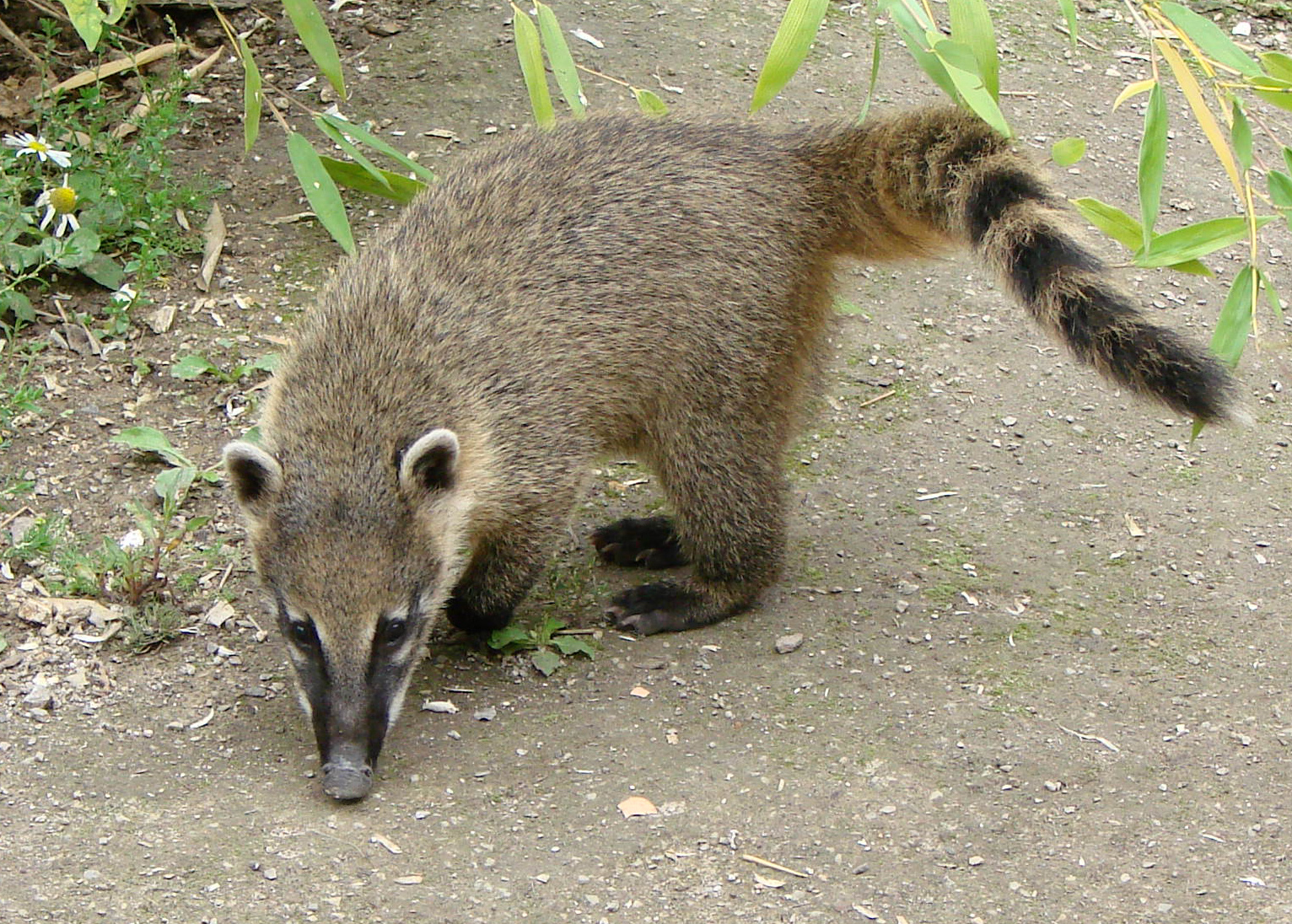
The coati Nasua nasua

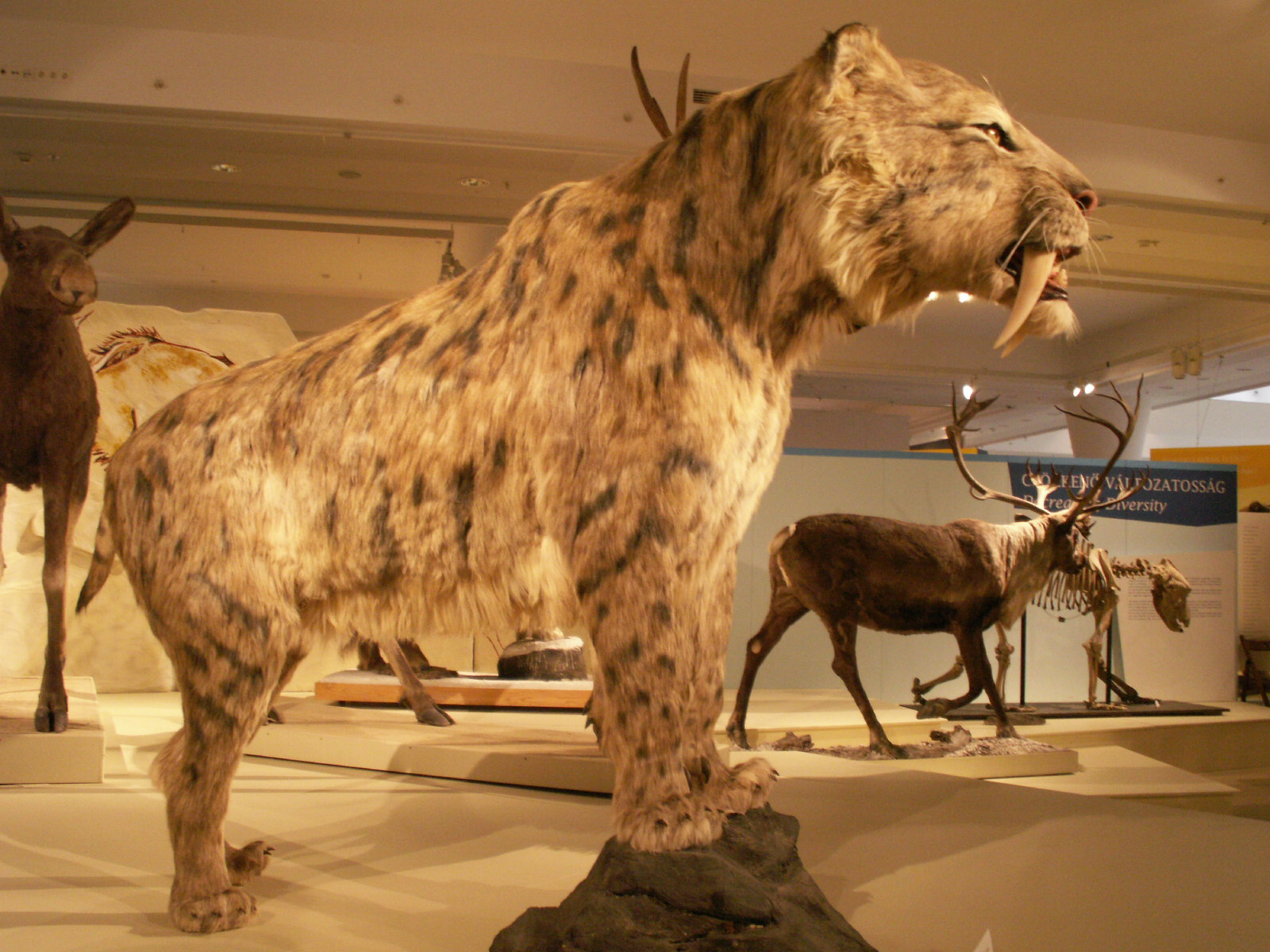
Saber-toothed †Smilodon populator

== See also ==
- Caribbean Plate § First American land bridge
- Central American Seaway
- Columbian Exchange
- List of mammals of the Caribbean
- List of mammals of Central America
- List of mammals of North America
- List of mammals of South America
- Lists of extinct animals by continent

== Notes ==
1. The native South American ungulates dwindled gradually as North American ungulates invaded and diversified. The changes in number and composition of South America's ungulate genera over time are given in the table below. The Quaternary extinction event that delivered the coup de grâce to the native Neotropic ungulates also dealt a heavy blow to South America's ungulate immigrants.
  Change in number of South American ungulate genera over time
  Time interval		Source region of genera		
  Geologic period	Range (Ma ago)	South America	North America	Both
  Huayquerian	9.0–6.8	13	0	13
  Montehermosan	6.8–4.0	12	1	13
  Chapadmalalan	4.0–3.0	12	1	13
  Uquian	3.0–1.5	5	10	15
  Ensenadan	1.5–0.8	3	14	17
  Lujanian	0.8–0.011	3	20	23
  Holocene	0.011–0	0	11	11
