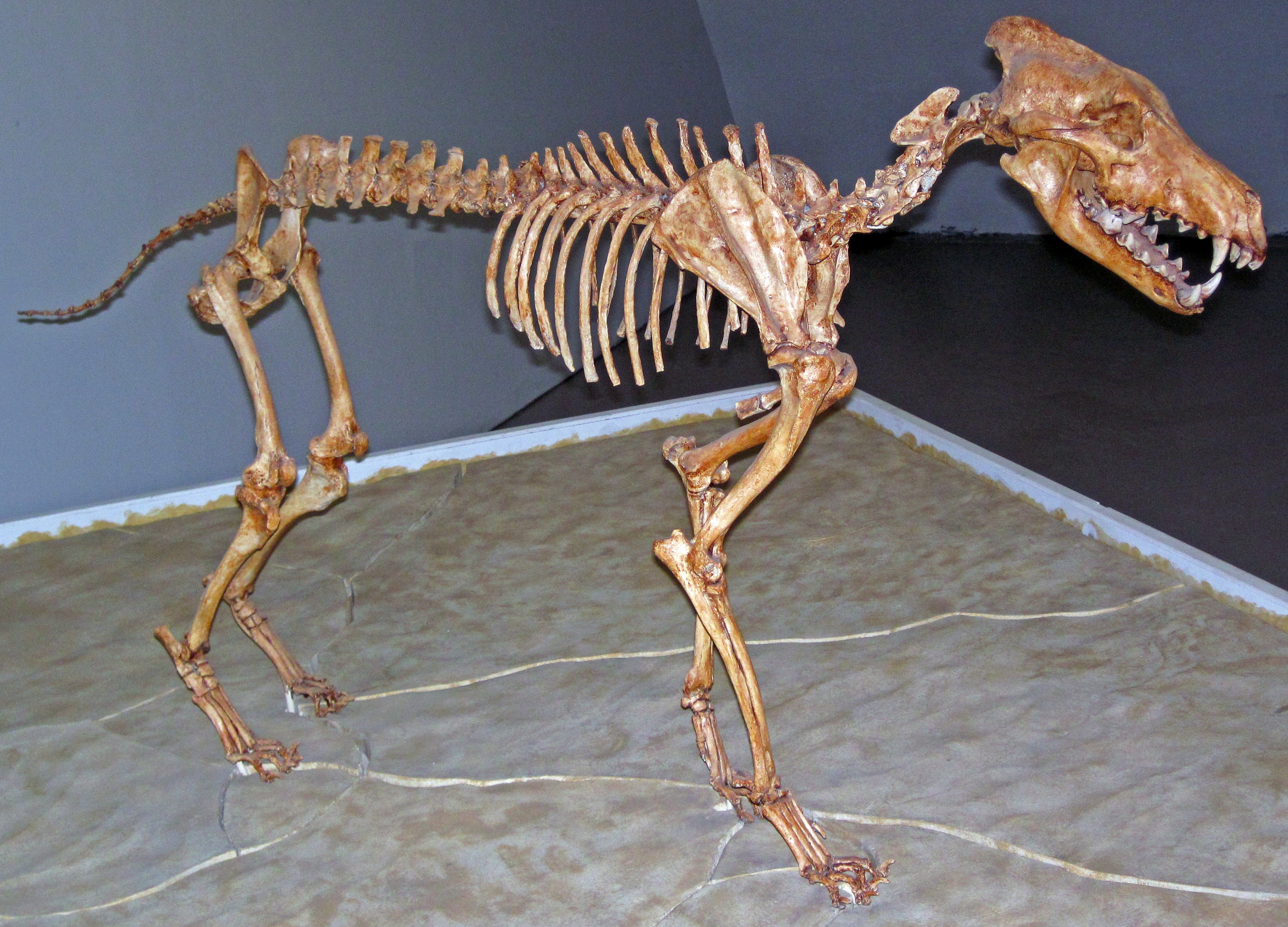
- Mounted skeleton, Sternberg Museum of Natural History

Scientific classification
- Kingdom: Animalia
- Phylum: Chordata
- Class: Mammalia
- Order: Carnivora
- Family: Canidae
- Subfamily: Caninae
- Tribe: Canini
- Subtribe: Canina
- Genus: †Aenocyon
- Species: †A. dirus

Binomial name
- †Aenocyon dirus (Leidy, 1858)

Subspecies
- †A. d. dirus (Leidy, 1858); †A. d. guildayi (Kurtén 1984)

Synonyms
- List of synonyms: Canis primaevus Leidy, 1854; Canis dirus Leidy, 1858; Canis indianensis Leidy, 1869; Canis mississippiensis? Allen, 1876; Canis nehringi? Ameghino, 1902; Canis ayersi Sellards, 1916; Aenocyon dirus ayersi Sellards, 1916; Aenocyon ayersi Sellards, 1916; Aenocyon dirus nebrascensis Frick, 1930 (nomen nudum)

= Dire wolf =

Dire wolf Temporal range: Late Pleistocene – early Holocene Possible Middle Pleistocene records

Extinct species of canine mammal

The dire wolf (Aenocyon dirus /aɪˈnɒkaɪ.ɒn ˈdaɪrəs/) is an extinct species of canine which was native to the Americas during the Late Pleistocene and Early Holocene epochs (125,000–10,000 years ago). The species was named in 1858, four years after the first specimen had been found. Two subspecies are proposed, Aenocyon dirus guildayi and Aenocyon dirus dirus, but this assignment has been recently considered questionable. The largest collection of its fossils has been obtained from the Rancho La Brea Tar Pits in Los Angeles.

Dire wolf remains have been found across a broad range of habitats including plains, grasslands, and some forested mountain areas of North America and the arid savanna of South America. The sites range in elevation from sea level to 2,255 meters (7,400 ft). Dire wolf fossils have rarely been found north of 42°N latitude; there have been only five unconfirmed records above this latitude. This range restriction is thought to be due to temperature, prey, or habitat limitations imposed by proximity to the Laurentide and Cordilleran ice sheets that existed at the time.

The dire wolf was about the same size as the largest modern forms of gray wolf (Canis lupus). A. d. guildayi weighed on average 60 kilograms (132 lb) and A. d. dirus was on average 68 kg (150 lb). Its skull and dentition matched those of C. lupus, but its teeth were larger with greater shearing ability, and its bite force at the canine tooth was stronger than any known Canis species. These characteristics are thought to be adaptations for preying on Late Pleistocene megaherbivores; in North America, its prey is suggested to have included western horses, dwarf pronghorn, flat-headed peccary, ground sloths, ancient bison, and camels.

Dire wolves lived as recently as 10,000 years ago, according to dated remains. Its extinction occurred during the Quaternary extinction event, disappearing along with its main prey species; its reliance on megaherbivores has been proposed as the cause of its extinction, along with climatic change and competition with other species, or a combination of those factors.

== Taxonomy ==
From the 1850s, the fossil remains of extinct large wolves were being found in the United States, and it was not immediately clear that these all belonged to one species. The first specimen of what would later become associated with Aenocyon dirus was found in mid-1854 in the bed of the Ohio River near Evansville, Indiana. The fossilized jawbone with cheek teeth was obtained by geologist Joseph Granville Norwood from an Evansville collector, Francis A. Linck. Paleontologist Joseph Leidy determined that the specimen represented an extinct species of wolf and reported it under the name of Canis primaevus. Norwood's letters to Leidy are preserved along with the type specimen (the first of a species that has a written description) at the Academy of Natural Sciences of Philadelphia. In 1857, while exploring the Niobrara River valley in Nebraska, Leidy found the vertebrae of an extinct Canis species that he reported the following year under the name C. dirus. The name C. primaevus (Leidy 1854) was later renamed Canis indianensis (Leidy 1869) when Leidy found out that the name C. primaevus had previously been used by the British naturalist Brian Houghton Hodgson for the dhole.

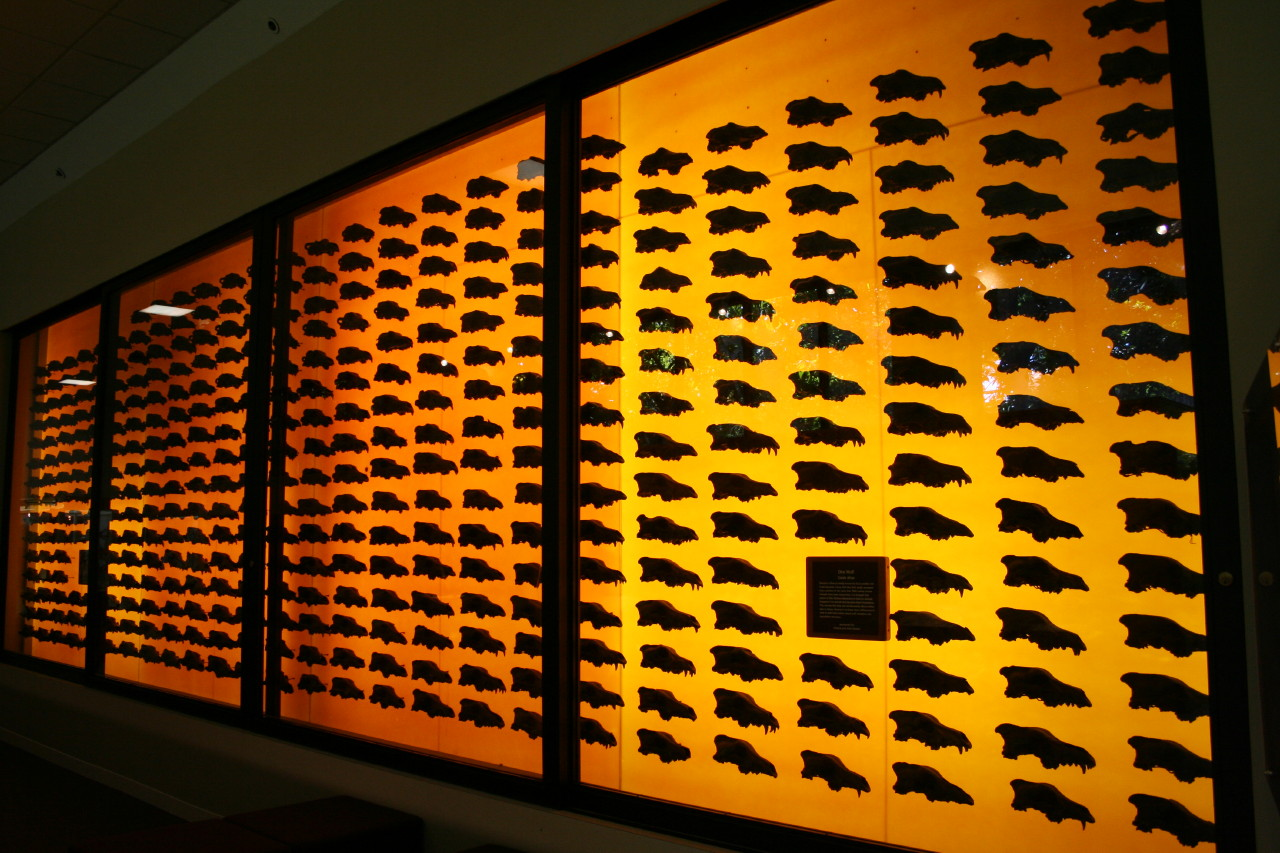
Display at the Page Museum of 404 dire wolf skulls found in the La Brea Tar Pits

In 1876, zoologist Joel Asaph Allen discovered the remains of Canis mississippiensis (Allen 1876) and associated these with C. dirus (Leidy 1858) and Canis indianensis (Leidy 1869). As so little was found of these three specimens, Allen thought it best to leave each specimen listed under its provisional name until more material could be found to reveal their relationship. In 1908 paleontologist John Campbell Merriam began retrieving numerous fossilized bone fragments of a large wolf from the Rancho La Brea tar pits. By 1912 he had found a skeleton sufficiently complete to be able to formally recognize these and the previously found specimens under the name C. dirus (Leidy 1858). Because the rules of nomenclature stipulated that the name of a species should be the oldest name ever applied to it, Merriam therefore selected the name of Leidy's 1858 specimen, C. dirus. In 1915 paleontologist Edward Troxell indicated his agreement with Merriam when he declared C. indianensis a synonym of C. dirus. In 1918, after studying these fossils, Merriam proposed consolidating their names under the separate genus Aenocyon (from ainos, 'terrible' and cyon, 'dog') to become Aenocyon dirus, but at that time not everyone agreed with this extinct wolf being placed in a new genus separate from the genus Canis. Canis ayersi (Sellards 1916) and Aenocyon dirus (Merriam 1918) were recognized as synonyms of C. dirus by the paleontologist Ernest Lundelius in 1972. All of the above taxa were declared synonyms of C. dirus in 1979, according to the paleontologist Ronald M. Nowak. However, Hill et al. (2025) examined the taxonomic history of C. mississippiensis and directly compared the bones attributed to C. mississippiensis with those of the Pleistocene gray wolf (Canis lupus) and the dire wolf (Aenocyon dirus), reaching a conclusion that C. mississippiensis is most likely synonymous with C. lupus.

In 1984, a study by Finnish paleontologist Björn Kurtén recognized a geographic variation within the dire wolf populations and proposed two subspecies: Canis dirus guildayi (named by Kurtén in honor of American paleontologist John E. Guilday) for specimens from California and Mexico that exhibited shorter limbs and longer teeth, and Canis dirus dirus for specimens east of the North American Continental Divide that exhibited longer limbs and shorter teeth. Kurtén designated a maxilla found in Hermit's Cave, New Mexico, as representing the nominate subspecies C. d. dirus. In 2019, this subspecific assignment was questioned by paleontologists Damián Ruiz-Ramoni and Marisol Montellano-Ballesteros at National Autonomous University of Mexico, who were unable to find a significant difference between the specimens assigned to each proposed subspecies.

In 2021, a DNA study found the dire wolf to be a highly divergent lineage when compared with the extant wolf-like canines, and this finding is consistent with the previously proposed taxonomic classification of the dire wolf as genus Aenocyon (Ancient Greek: "terrible wolf") as proposed by Merriam in 1918.

=== Evolution ===
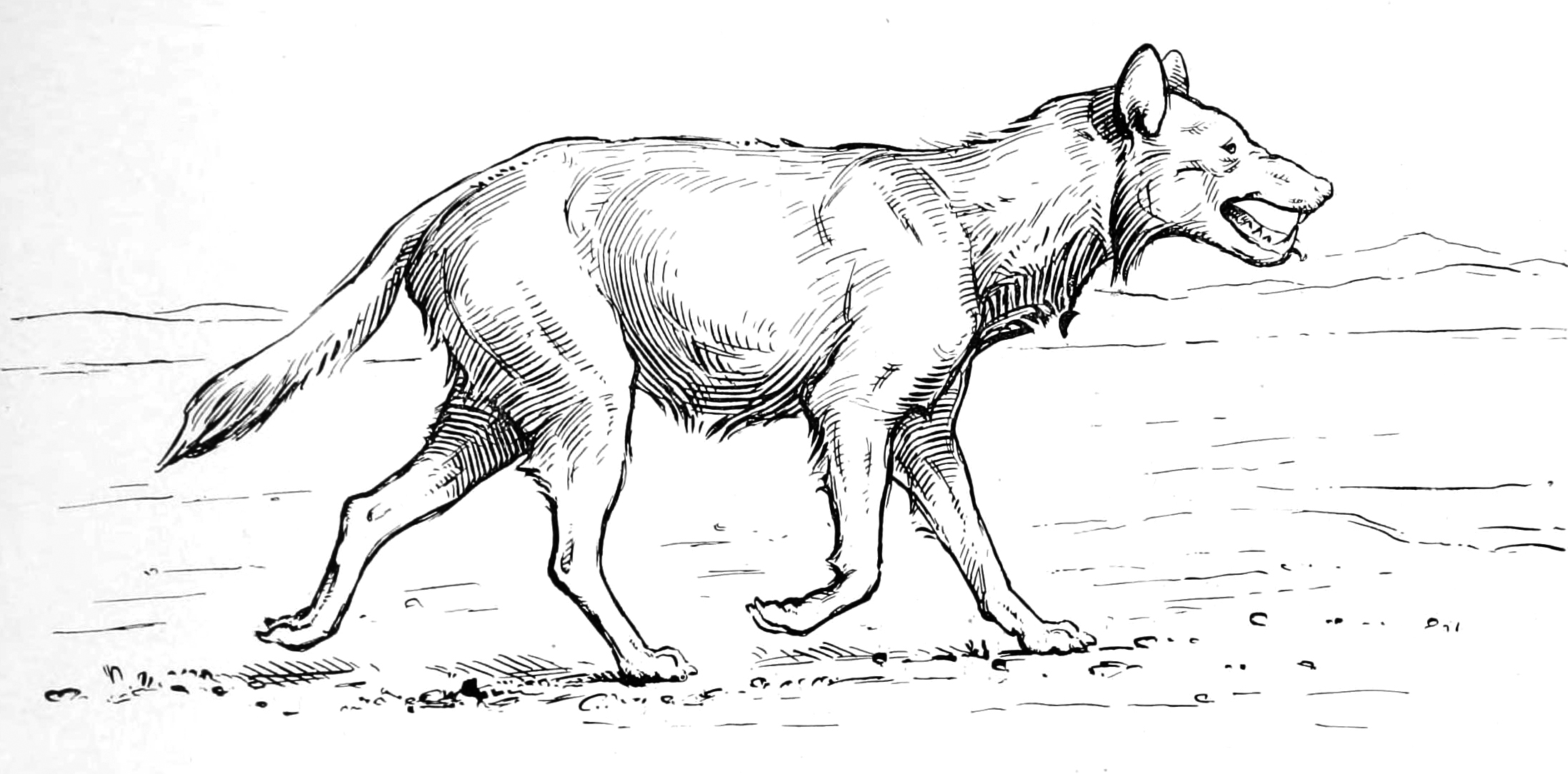
Life restoration by Erwin S. Christman, 1916

The canid family first appears in the North American fossil record around 40 million years ago, and the canine subfamily Caninae about 32 million years ago. From the Caninae, the ancestors of the fox-like Vulpini and the dog-like Canini branched off about 9 million years ago. The Canini are first represented by Eucyon, and mostly by coyote-like Eucyon davisi that was widely spread across North America. From the Canini the Cerdocyonina developed 6–5 million years ago, today represented by their canid descendants distinctly native to South America. Fossils of its sister clade, the wolf-like Canina, first appear 5 million years ago; however, they are believed to have likely originated as far back as 9 million years ago. Around 7 million years ago, the canines expanded into Eurasia and Africa, with Eucyon giving rise to the first members of the Canis genus in Europe. Around 4–3 million years ago C. chihliensis, the first wolf-sized member of Canis, arose in China and radiated into multiple other wolf-like canids across Eurasia and Africa. Members of the genus Canis later expand back into North America.

The dire wolf evolved in North America. However, its ancestral lineage is debated, with two competing theories: The first theory is based on fossil morphology, which indicates that an expansion of the genus Canis out of Eurasia led to the dire wolf. The second theory is based on DNA evidence, which indicates that the dire wolf arose from an ancestral lineage that originated in the Americas and was separate from the genus Canis.

==== Morphological evidence ====
Historical view of dire wolf divergence based on morphology

- †Canis chihliensis
  - Canis lupus
  - †Canis armbrusteri
    - †Canis gezi
    - †Canis nehringi
    - †Canis dirus
      - - †Canis dirus guildayi
        - †Canis dirus dirus

Evolutionary divergence of the dire wolf based on fossil morphology, now overturned by DNA evidence

Morphological evidence based on fossil remains indicates an expansion of genus Canis from out of Eurasia led to the dire wolf.

In 1974 Robert A. Martin proposed that the large North American wolf C. armbrusteri (Armbruster's wolf) was C. lupus. Nowak, Kurtén, and Annalisa Berta proposed that C. dirus was not derived from C. lupus. In 1987, a new hypothesis proposed that a mammal population could give rise to a larger form called a hypermorph during times when food was abundant, but when food later became scarce the hypermorph would either adapt to a smaller form or go extinct. This hypothesis might explain the large body sizes found in many Late Pleistocene mammals compared to their modern counterparts. Both extinction and speciation – a process by which a new species splits from an older one – could occur together during periods of climatic extremes. Gloria D. Goulet agreed with Martin, proposing further that this hypothesis might explain the sudden appearance of C. dirus in North America and, judging from the similarities in their skull shapes, that C. lupus had given rise to the C. dirus hypermorph due to an abundance of game, a stable environment, and large competitors.

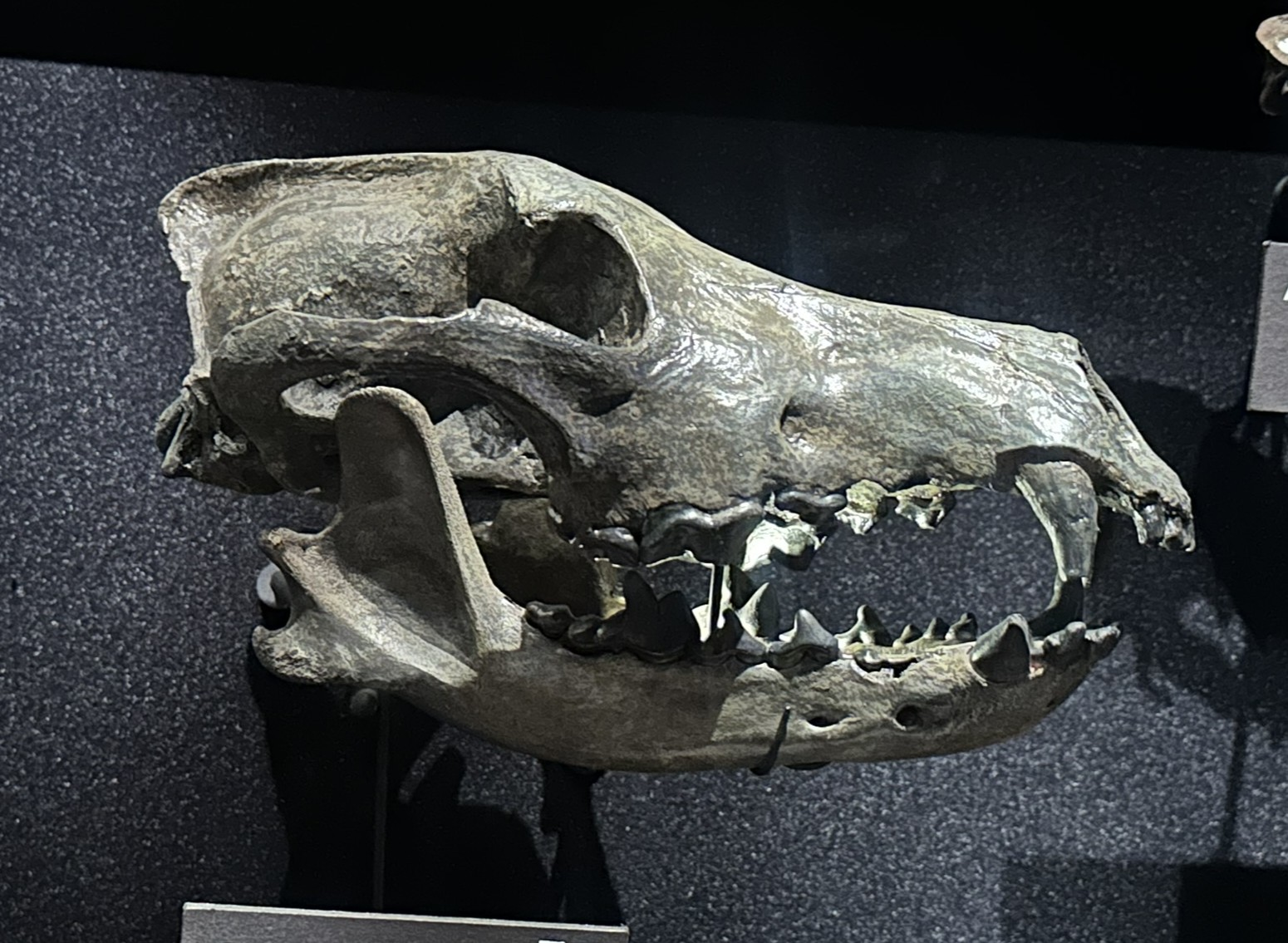
Skull of Armbruster's wolf, a possible ancestor of the dire wolf

The three paleontologists Xiaoming Wang, Richard H. Tedford, and Ronald M. Nowak propose that C. dirus evolved from Canis armbrusteri, with Nowak stating that both species arose in the Americas and that specimens found in Cumberland Cave, Maryland, appear to be C. armbrusteri diverging into C. dirus. Nowak believed that Canis edwardii was the first appearance of the wolf in North America, and it appears to be close to the lineage which produced C. armbrusteri and C. dirus. Tedford believes that the early wolf from China, Canis chihliensis, may have been the ancestor of both C. armbrusteri and the gray wolf C. lupus. The sudden appearance of C. armbrusteri in mid-latitude North America during the Early Pleistocene 1.5 million years ago, along with the mammoth, suggests that it was an immigrant from Asia, with the gray wolf C. lupus evolving in Beringia later in the Pleistocene and entering mid-latitude North America during the Last Glacial Period along with its Beringian prey. In 2010 Francisco Prevosti proposed that C. dirus was a sister taxon to C. lupus.

C. dirus lived in the Late Pleistocene to the early Holocene, 125,000–10,000 YBP (years before present), in North and South America. The majority of fossils from the eastern C. d. dirus have been dated 125,000–75,000 YBP, but the western C. d. guildayi fossils are not only smaller in size but more recent; thus it has been proposed that C. d. guildayi derived from C. d. dirus. However, there are disputed specimens of C. dirus that date to 250,000 YBP. Fossil specimens of C. dirus discovered at four sites in the Hay Springs area of Sheridan County, Nebraska, were named Aenocyon dirus nebrascensis (Frick 1930, undescribed), but Frick did not publish a description of them. Nowak later referred to this material as C. armbrusteri; then, in 2009, Tedford formally published a description of the specimens and noted that, although they exhibited some morphological characteristics of both C. armbrusteri and C. dirus, he referred to them only as C. dirus.

A fossil discovered in the Horse Room of the Salamander Cave in the Black Hills of South Dakota may possibly be C. dirus; if so, this fossil is one of the earliest specimens on record. It was catalogued as Canis cf. C. dirus (where cf. in Latin means confer, uncertain). The fossil of a horse found in the Horse Room provided a uranium-series dating of 252,000 YBP and the Canis cf. dirus specimen was assumed to be from the same period. C. armbrusteri and C. dirus share some characteristics (synapomorphies) that imply the latter's descent from the former. The fossil record suggests C. dirus originated around 250,000 YBP in the open terrain of the mid-continent before expanding eastward and displacing its ancestor C. armbrusteri. The first appearance of C. dirus would therefore be 250,000 YBP in California and Nebraska, and later in the rest of the United States, Canada, Mexico, Venezuela, Ecuador, Bolivia, and Peru, but the identity of these earliest fossils is not confirmed. An earlier Middle Pleistocene record, dating to the Marine Isotope Stage 19 (780,000 years ago), has been suggested based on possible specimens from California.

In South America, C. dirus specimens dated to the Late Pleistocene were found along the north and west coasts, but none have been found in Argentina, an area that was inhabited by Canis gezi and Canis nehringi. Given their similarities and timeframes, it is proposed that C. gezi was the ancestor of Canis nehringi. One study found that C. dirus was more evolutionarily derived than C. nehringi, and was larger in the size and construction of its lower molars for more efficient predation. For this reason, some researchers have proposed that C. dirus may have originated in South America. Tedford proposed that C. armbrusteri was the common ancestor for both the North and South American wolves. Later studies suggested that C. dirus and C. nehringi were the same species, though this possible synonymy is not officially formalized yet, and that C. dirus had migrated from North America into South America, making it a participant in the Great American Interchange. In 2018, a study found that Canis gezi did not fall under genus Canis and should be classified under the subtribe Cerdocyonina; however, no genus was proposed.

The 2020 discovery of a claimed dire wolf fossil in northeast China indicates that dire wolves may have crossed Beringia when it existed, though Ruiz-Ramoni et al. (2022) doubted that this specimen represents a dire wolf. They also proposed that the Armbruster's wolf should be given a new genus name, possibly included within the genus Aenocyon, as it was probably ancestral to the dire wolf and its assignment within the genus Canis is not well-founded. This was also considered plausible by other authors. In their revision of the Pleistocene assemblage from the Cumberland Bone Cave, Eshelman et al. (2025) proposed the new combination of the Armbruster's wolf within the genus Aenocyon (A. armbrusteri), which would expand the earliest known occurrence of this genus up to the Middle Pleistocene.

==== DNA evidence ====
Dire wolf bones in La Brea tar seep

DNA evidence indicates the dire wolf arose from an ancestral lineage that originated in the Americas and was separate to genus Canis.

In 1992 an attempt was made to extract a mitochondrial DNA sequence from the skeletal remains of A. d. guildayi to compare its relationship to other Canis species. The attempt was unsuccessful because these remains had been removed from the La Brea pits and tar could not be removed from the bone material. In 2014 an attempt to extract DNA from a Columbian mammoth from the tar pits also failed, with the study concluding that organic compounds from the asphalt permeate the bones of all ancient samples from the La Brea pits, hindering the extraction of DNA samples.

Research in 2021 found the dire wolf to be a highly divergent lineage which last shared a most recent common ancestor with the wolf-like canines 5.7 million years ago. In the study, the nuclear DNA (from the cell nucleus) taken from five dire wolf fossils dating from 13,000 to 50,000 years ago was sequenced. The study also measured numerous dire wolf and gray wolf skeletal samples that showed their morphologies to be highly similar, which had led to the theory that the dire wolf and the gray wolf had a close evolutionary relationship. The morphological similarity between dire wolves and gray wolves was concluded to be due to convergent evolution. Members of the wolf-like canines are known to hybridize with each other but the study could find no indication of genetic admixture from the five dire wolf samples with extant North American gray wolves and coyotes nor their common ancestor. This finding indicates that the wolf and coyote lineages evolved in isolation from the dire wolf lineage.

The study proposes an early origin of the dire wolf lineage in the Americas, and that this geographic isolation allowed them to develop a degree of reproductive isolation since their divergence 5.7 million years ago. Coyotes, dholes, gray wolves, and the extinct Xenocyon evolved in Eurasia and expanded into North America relatively recently during the Late Pleistocene, therefore there was no admixture with the dire wolf. The long-term isolation of the dire wolf lineage implies that other American fossil taxa, including C. armbrusteri and C. edwardii, may also belong to the dire wolf's lineage. The study's findings are consistent with the previously proposed taxonomic classification of the dire wolf as genus Aenocyon.

Cladogram showing relationships among living and extinct wolf-like canids based on DNA ignoring hybridisation based on the results of Perri and colleagues, 2021 (Note: The cladogram below is based on Perri 2021 modified to incorporate recent findings on Canis species, and the renaming of the African jackals as genus Lupulella.)

- Canini
  - Cerdocyonina (South American canids)
  - Canina
    - - - - Canis
            (wolves, coyotes, dogs, Eurasian jackals, etc.)
          - Cuon
            Cuon alpinus (dhole)
        - - Lycaon
            Lycaon pictus (African wild dog)
      - - Lupulella
          (African jackals)
    - - †Aenocyon
        †Aenocyon dirus (dire wolf)

Diagram showing relationship of the dire wolf to other members of the tribe Canini after Gedman and colleagues 2026, showing the hybrid ancestry of the dire wolf including the 39% ancestry from Cerdocyonina, as well as the possible 17% ancestry from the dire wolf lineage in the coyote-grey wolf common ancestor

A later 2026 study sequenced the ancient DNA of two dire wolf individuals (one around 13,000 and one more than 72,000 years old), generating their nuclear genomes, obtaining much higher genome coverage than was obtained from the remains sampled in the 2021 study. They analysed the genomes using admixture analysis, and found that the dire wolf had a more complex ancestry than previously thought. This analysis showed that the dire wolf lineage evolved via reticulate evolution resulting from interspecies hybridisation, with approximately 40% of its ancestry derived from the cerdocyonine lineage (which includes South American canids like the maned wolf), and 60% from an ancestor from the subtribe Canina more closely related to wolves, coyotes and dholes than to Lupulella jackals or the African wild dog. The study also suggested that the post-hybridisation dire wolf lineage may have contributed 17% of the ancestry of the mutual common ancestor of grey wolves and coyotes. The divergence between the dire wolf and other members of Canina was estimated at around 4.5 million years ago.

=== Radiocarbon dating ===
The age of most dire wolf localities is determined solely by biostratigraphy, but biostratigraphy is an unreliable indicator within asphalt deposits. Some sites have been radiocarbon dated, with dire wolf specimens from the La Brea pits dated in calendar years as follows: 82 specimens dated 13,000–14,000 YBP; 40 specimens dated 14,000–16,000 YBP; 77 specimens dated 14,000–18,000 YBP; 37 specimens dated 17,000–18,000 YBP; 26 specimens dated 21,000–30,000 YBP; 40 specimens dated 25,000–28,000 YBP; and 6 specimens dated 32,000–37,000 YBP. A specimen from Powder Mill Creek Cave, Missouri, was dated at 13,170 YBP.

== Description ==
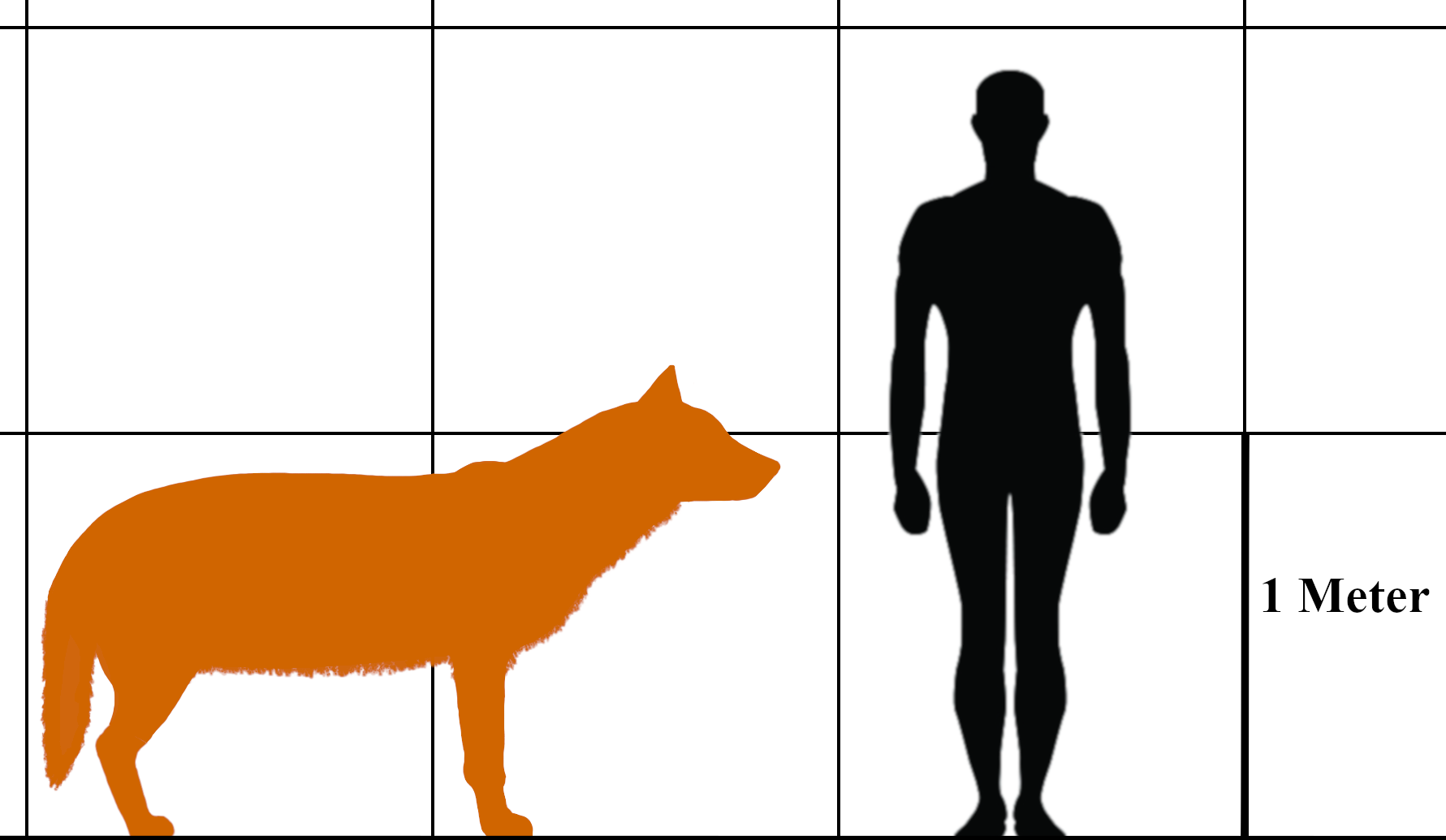
Size comparison with a human

The average dire wolf proportions were similar to those of two modern North American wolves: the Yukon wolf (Canis lupus pambasileus) and the Northwestern wolf (Canis lupus occidentalis). The largest northern wolves today have a shoulder height of up to 97 cm (38 in) and a body length of 180 cm (69 in). Some dire wolf specimens from Rancho La Brea are smaller than this, and some are larger. The dire wolf had smaller feet and a larger head than a northern wolf of the same body size. The skull length could reach 310 mm (12 in) or longer, with a broader palate, frontal region, and zygomatic arches than the Yukon wolf. These dimensions make the skull very massive. Its sagittal crest was higher, with the inion showing a significant backward projection, and with the rear ends of the nasal bones extending relatively far back into the skull. A connected skeleton of a dire wolf from Rancho La Brea is difficult to find because the tar allows the bones to disassemble in many directions. Parts of a vertebral column have been assembled, and it was found to be similar to that of the modern wolf, with the same number of vertebrae.

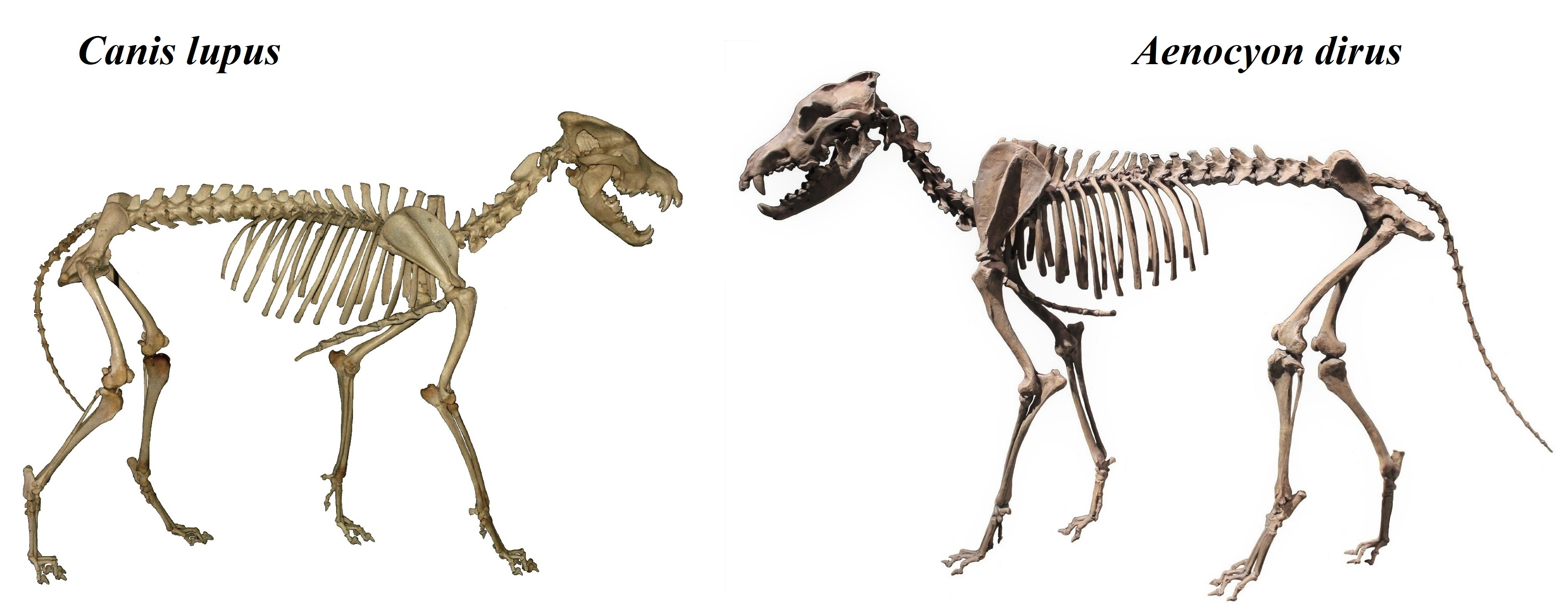
Gray wolf skeleton (left) and dire wolf skeleton

Geographic differences in dire wolves were not detected until 1984, when a study of skeletal remains showed differences in a few cranio-dental features and limb proportions between specimens from California and Mexico (A. d. guildayi) and those found from the east of the Continental Divide (A. d. dirus). A comparison of limb size shows that the rear limbs of A. d. guildayi were 8% shorter than the Yukon wolf due to a significantly shorter tibia and metatarsus, and that the front limbs were also shorter due to their slightly shorter lower bones. With its comparatively lighter and smaller limbs and massive head, A. d. guildayi was not as well adapted for running as timber wolves and coyotes. A. d. dirus possessed significantly longer limbs than A. d. guildayi. The forelimbs were 14% longer than A. d. guildayi due to 10% longer humeri, 15% longer radii, and 15% longer metacarpals. The rear limbs were 10% longer than A. d. guildayi due to 10% longer femora and tibiae, and 15% longer metatarsals. A. d. dirus is comparable to the Yukon wolf in limb length. The largest A. d. dirus femur was found in Carroll Cave, Missouri, and measured 278 mm (10.9 in).

Aenocyon dirus guildayi compared with the Yukon wolf by the mean length of limb bones in millimeters (inches)
Limb variable	A. d. guildayi	Yukon wolf	A. d. dirus
Humerus (upper front leg)	218 mm (8.6 in)	237 mm (9.3 in)	240 mm (9.4 in)
Radius (lower front leg)	209 mm (8.2 in)	232 mm (9.1 in)	240 mm (9.4 in)
Metacarpal (front foot)	88 mm (3.4 in)	101 mm (4.0 in)	101 mm (4.0 in)
Femur (upper back leg)	242 mm (9.5 in)	251 mm (9.9 in)	266 mm (10.5 in)
Tibia (lower back leg)	232 mm (9.1 in)	258 mm (10.2 in)	255 mm (10.0 in)
Metatarsal (back foot)	93 mm (3.7 in)	109 mm (4.3 in)	107 mm (4.2 in)

A. d. guildayi is estimated to have weighed on average 60 kg (132 lb), and A. d. dirus weighed on average 68 kg (150 lb) with some specimens being larger, but these could not have exceeded 110 kg (243 lb) due to skeletal limits. In comparison, the average weight of the Yukon wolf is 43 kg (95 lb) for males and 37 kg (82 lb) for females. Individual weights for Yukon wolves can vary from 21 kg (46 lb) to 55 kg (121 lb), with one Yukon wolf weighing 79.4 kg (175 lb). These figures show the average dire wolf to be similar in size to the largest modern gray wolf.

The remains of a complete male A. dirus are sometimes easy to identify compared to other Canis specimens because the baculum (penis bone) of the dire wolf is very different from that of all other living canids. A 2024 study found the baculum of a male dire wolf to be proportionally longer than the baculum of modern canids, which may be indicative of stronger competition between males and unusual behaviors among canids, including non-monogamous mating.

== Adaptation ==
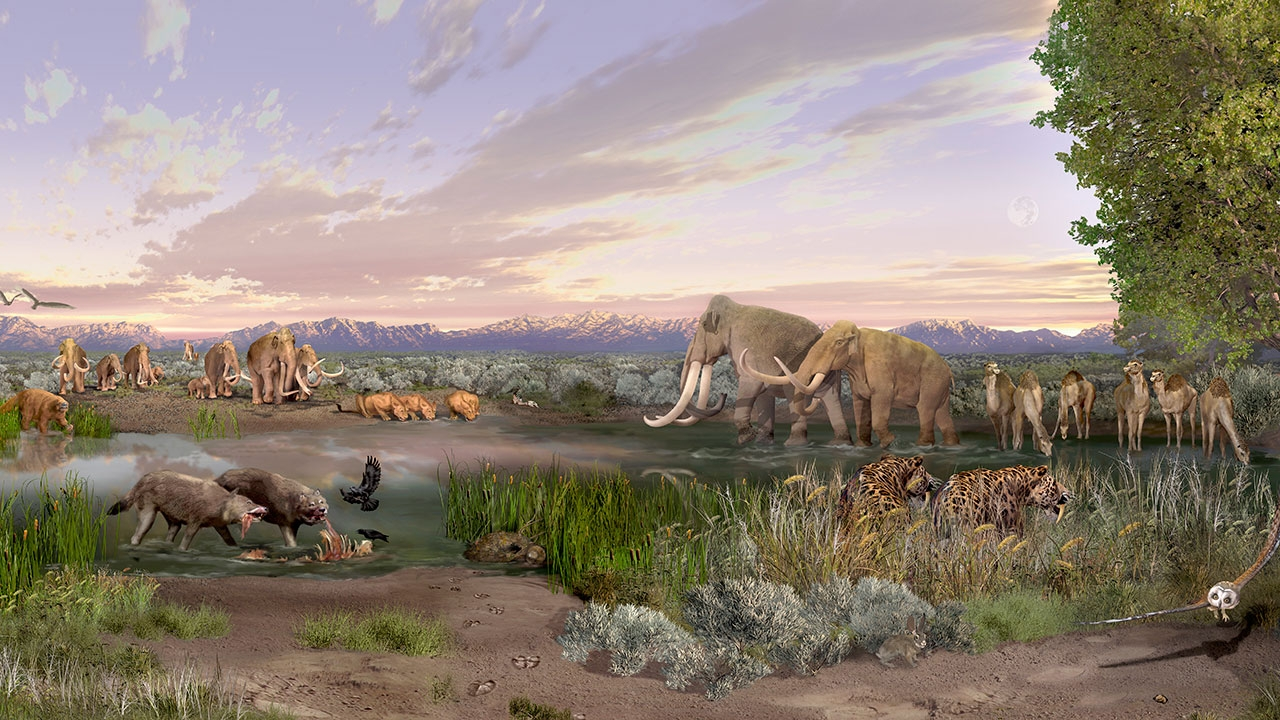
Environment of what is now White Sands National Park, with dire wolves feeding on the left

Ecological factors such as habitat type, climate, prey specialization, and predatory competition have been shown to greatly influence gray wolf craniodental plasticity, which is an adaptation of the cranium and teeth due to the influences of the environment. Similarly, the dire wolf was a hypercarnivore, with a skull and dentition adapted for hunting large and struggling prey; the shape of its skull and snout changed across time, and changes in the size of its body have been correlated with climate fluctuations.

=== Paleoecology ===
The last glacial period, commonly referred to as the "Ice Age", spanned 125,000–14,500 YBP and was the most recent glacial period within the current ice age, which occurred during the last years of the Pleistocene era. The Ice Age reached its peak during the Last Glacial Maximum, when ice sheets began advancing from 33,000 YBP and reached their maximum limits 26,500 YBP. Deglaciation commenced in the Northern Hemisphere approximately 19,000 YBP and in Antarctica approximately 14,500 YBP, which is consistent with evidence that glacial meltwater was the primary source for an abrupt rise in sea level 14,500 YBP. Access into northern North America was blocked by the Wisconsin glaciation. The fossil evidence from the Americas points to the extinction mainly of large animals, termed Pleistocene megafauna, near the end of the last glaciation.

Coastal southern California from 60,000 YBP to the end of the Last Glacial Maximum was cooler and with a more balanced supply of moisture than today. During the Last Glacial Maximum, the mean annual temperature decreased from 11 °C (52 °F) down to 5 °C (41 °F) degrees, and annual precipitation had decreased from 100 cm (39 in) down to 45 cm (18 in). This region was unaffected by the climatic effects of the Wisconsin glaciation and is thought to have been an Ice Age refugium for animals and cold-sensitive plants. By 24,000 YBP, the abundance of oak and chaparral decreased, but pines increased, creating open parklands similar to today's coastal montane/juniper woodlands. After 14,000 YBP, the abundance of conifers decreased, and those of the modern coastal plant communities, including oak woodland, chaparral, and coastal sage scrub, increased. The Santa Monica Plain lies north of the city of Santa Monica and extends along the southern base of the Santa Monica Mountains, and 28,000–26,000 YBP it was dominated by coastal sage scrub, with cypress and pines at higher elevations. The Santa Monica Mountains supported a chaparral community on its slopes and isolated coast redwood and dogwood in its protected canyons, along with river communities that included willow, red cedar, and sycamore. These plant communities suggest a winter rainfall similar to that of modern coastal southern California, but the presence of coast redwood now found 600 kilometres (370 mi) to the north indicates a cooler, moister, and less seasonal climate than today. This environment supported large herbivores that were prey for dire wolves and their competitors.

=== Prey ===
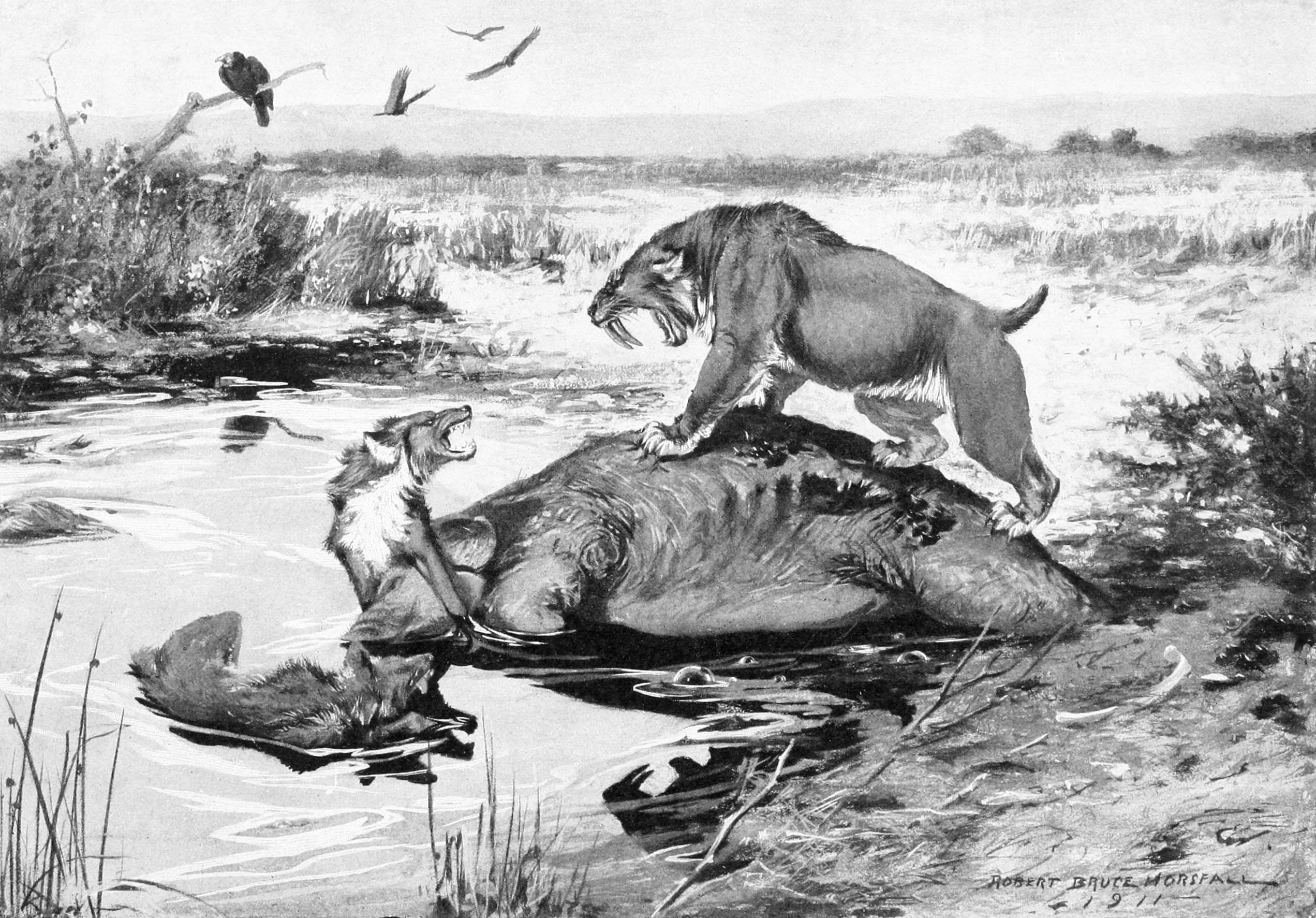
Two dire wolves and a saber-toothed cat (Smilodon) with the carcass of a Columbian mammoth at the La Brea Tar Pits by R. Bruce Horsfall

A range of animal and plant specimens that became entrapped and were then preserved in tar pits have been removed and studied so that researchers can learn about the past. The Rancho La Brea tar pits located near Los Angeles are a collection of pits of sticky asphalt deposits that differ in deposition time from 40,000 to 12,000 YBP. Commencing 40,000 YBP, trapped asphalt has been moved through fissures to the surface by methane pressure, forming seeps that can cover several square meters and be 9–11 m (30–36 ft) deep. A large number of dire wolf fossils have been recovered from the La Brea tar pits. Over 200,000 specimens (mostly fragments) have been recovered from the tar pits, with the remains ranging from Smilodon to squirrels, invertebrates, and plants. The time period represented in the pits includes the Last Glacial Maximum when global temperatures were 8 °C (14 °F) lower than today, the Pleistocene–Holocene transition (Bølling-Allerød interval), the Oldest Dryas cooling, the Younger Dryas cooling from 12,800 to 11,500 YBP, and the American megafaunal extinction event 12,700 YBP when 90 genera of mammals weighing over 44 kg (97 lb) became extinct.

Isotope analysis can be used to identify some chemical elements, allowing researchers to make inferences about the diet of the species found in the pits. Isotope analysis of bone collagen extracted from La Brea specimens provides evidence that the dire wolf, Smilodon, and the American lion (Panthera atrox) competed for the same prey. Their prey probably included the extinct camel Camelops hesternus, the extinct bison Bison antiquus, the "dwarf" pronghorn (Capromeryx minor), the equine Equus occidentalis, and Harlan's ground sloth (Paramylodon harlani) native to North American grasslands. The Columbian mammoth (Mammuthus columbi) and the American mastodon (Mammut americanum) were rare at La Brea. The horses remained mixed feeders and the pronghorns mixed browsers, but at the Last Glacial Maximum and its associated shift in vegetation the camels and bison were forced to rely more heavily on conifers. A similar later isotope study of Rancho La Brea dire wolves in 2020 found a similar result, suggesting that they primarily fed on juvenile bison and camels, to a lesser extent on Harlan's ground sloth. In Peccary Cave in the Ozark Mountains of Arkansas, the primary prey were likely flat-headed peccary (Platygonus compressus). This indicates that the dire wolf was not a prey specialist, and at the close of the Late Pleistocene before its extinction it was hunting or scavenging the most available herbivores. A study based on specimens found in Cedral, San Luis Potosí found that the dire wolf primarily preyed on herbivores that consumed C4 plants and on mixed-diet herbivores.

Dire wolves likely scavenged on American mastodon and ground sloth carcasses.

=== Dentition and bite force ===
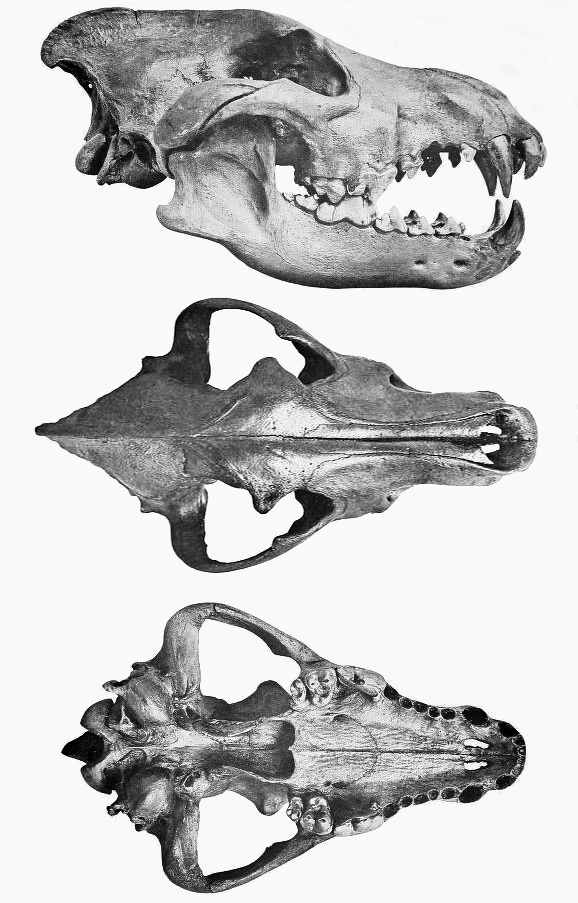
Skull of the dire wolf

When compared with the dentition of genus Canis members, the dire wolf was considered the most evolutionary derived (advanced) wolf-like species in the Americas. The dire wolf could be identified separately from all other Canis species by its possession of "P2 with a posterior cusplet; P3 with two posterior cusplets; M1 with a mestascylid, entocristed, entoconulid, and a transverse crest extending from the metaconid to the hyperconular shelf; M2 with entocristed and entoconulid."

A study of the estimated bite force at the canine teeth of a large sample of living and fossil mammalian predators, when adjusted for the body mass, found that for placental mammals the bite force at the canines (in newtons/kilogram of body weight) was greatest in the dire wolf (163), followed among the modern canids by the four hypercarnivores that often prey on animals larger than themselves: the African hunting dog (142), the gray wolf (136), the dhole (112), and the dingo (108). The bite force at the carnassials showed a similar trend to the canines. A predator's largest prey size is strongly influenced by its biomechanical limits. The morphology of the dire wolf was similar to that of its living relatives, and assuming that the dire wolf was a social hunter, then its high bite force relative to living canids suggests that it preyed on relatively large animals. The bite force rating of the bone-consuming spotted hyena (117) challenged the common assumption that high bite force in the canines and the carnassials was necessary to consume bone.

A study of the cranial measurements and jaw muscles of dire wolves found no significant differences with modern gray wolves in all but 4 of 15 measures. Upper dentition was the same except that the dire wolf had larger dimensions, and the P4 had a relatively larger, more massive blade that enhanced slicing ability at the carnassial. The jaw of the dire wolf had a relatively broader and more massive temporalis muscle, able to generate slightly more bite force than the gray wolf. Due to the jaw arrangement, the dire wolf had less temporalis leverage than the gray wolf at the lower carnassial (m1) and lower p4, but the functional significance of this is not known. The lower premolars were relatively slightly larger than those of the gray wolf, and the dire wolf m1 was much larger and had more shearing ability. The dire wolf canines had greater bending strength than those of living canids of equivalent size and were similar to those of hyenas and felids. All these differences indicate that the dire wolf was able to deliver stronger bites than the gray wolf, and with its flexible and more rounded canines was better adapted for struggling with its prey.

Canis lupus and Aenocyon dirus compared by mean mandible tooth measurements (millimeters)
Tooth variable	lupus modern North American	lupus La Brea	lupus Beringia	dirus dirus Sangamonian era (125,000–75,000 YBP)	dirus dirus Late Wisconsin (50,000 YBP)	dirus guildayi (40,000–13,000 YBP)
m1 length	28.2	28.9	29.6	36.1	35.2	33.3
m1 width	10.7	11.3	11.1	14.1	13.4	13.3
m1 trigonid length	19.6	21.9	20.9	24.5	24.0	24.4
p4 length	15.4	16.6	16.5	16.7	16.0	19.9
p4 width	-	-	-	10.1	9.6	10.3
p2 length	-	-	-	15.7	14.8	15.7
p2 width	-	-	-	7.1	6.7	7.4

=== Behavior ===
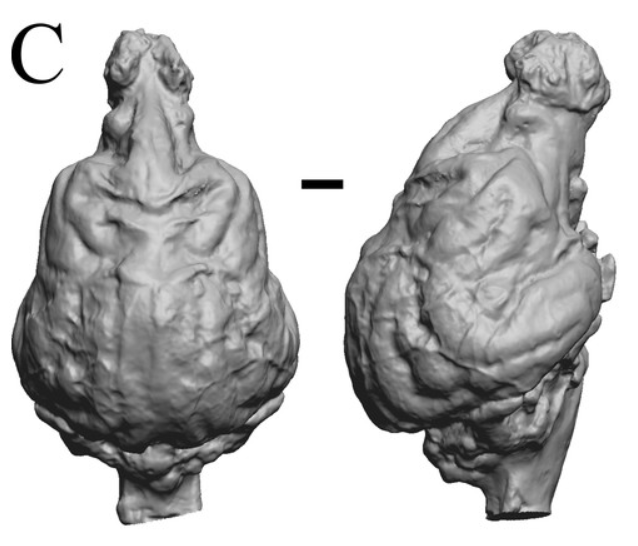
Digital endocast of the cranial cavity of dire wolf specimen LACMHC 2300-82.

At La Brea, predatory birds and mammals were attracted to dead or dying herbivores that had become mired, and then these predators became trapped themselves. Herbivore entrapment was estimated to have occurred once every fifty years, and for every instance of herbivore remains found in the pits there were an estimated ten carnivores. A. d. guildayi is the most common carnivoran found at La Brea, followed by Smilodon. Remains of dire wolves outnumber remains of gray wolves in the tar pits by a ratio of five to one. During the Last Glacial Maximum, coastal California, with a climate slightly cooler and wetter than today, is thought to have been a refuge, and a comparison of the frequency of dire wolves and other predator remains at La Brea to other parts of California and North America indicates significantly greater abundances; therefore, the higher dire wolf numbers in the La Brea region did not reflect the wider area. Assuming that only a few of the carnivores that were feeding became trapped, it is likely that fairly sizeable groups of dire wolves fed together on these occasions.

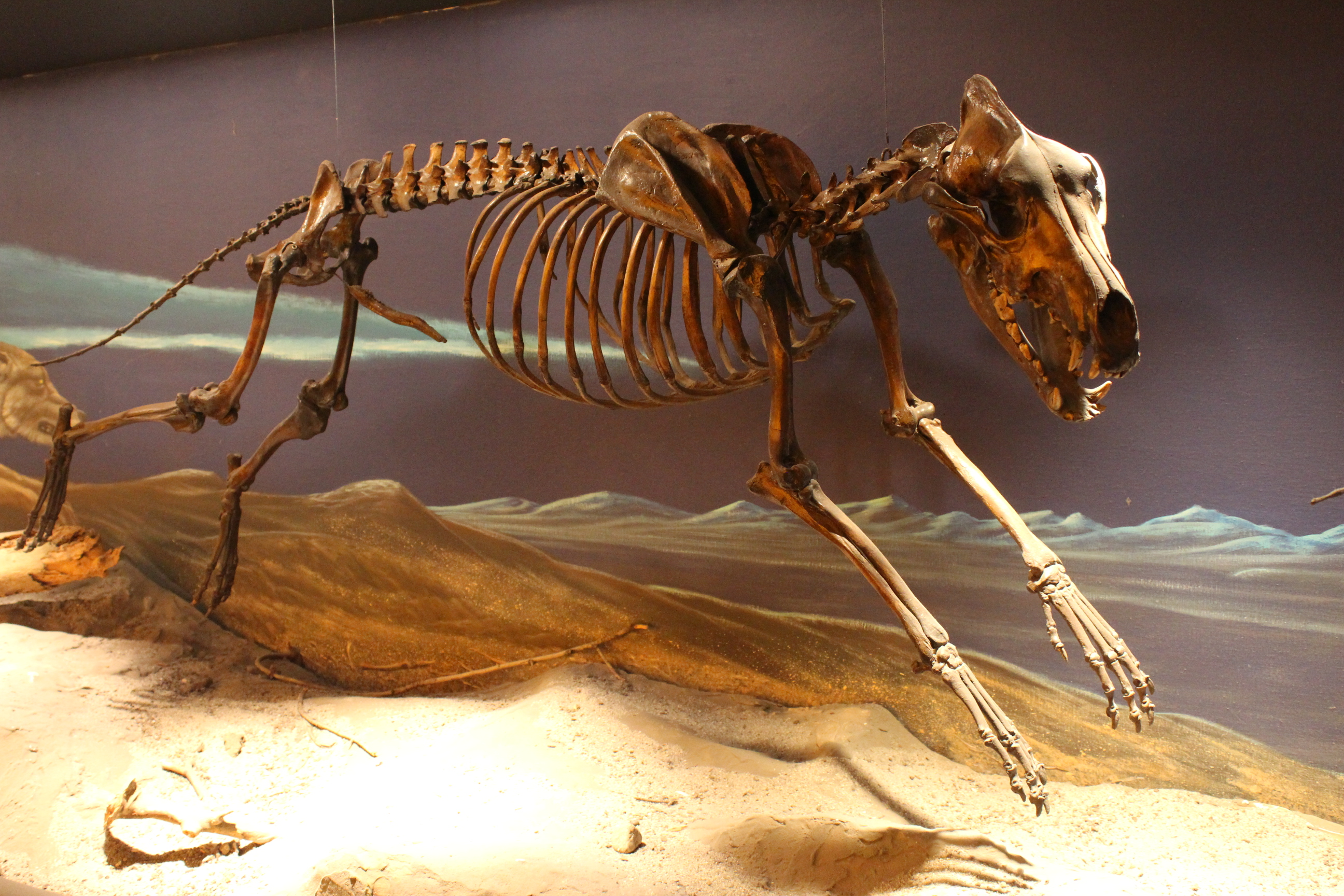
Skeleton from the La Brea Tar Pits mounted in running pose. Note the baculum between the rear legs.

The difference between the male and female of a species apart from their sex organs is called sexual dimorphism, and in this regard little variance exists among the canids. A study of dire wolf remains dated 15,360–14,310 YBP and taken from one pit that focused on skull length, canine tooth size, and lower molar length showed little dimorphism, similar to that of the gray wolf, indicating that dire wolves lived in monogamous pairs. Their large size and highly carnivorous dentition supports the proposal that the dire wolf was a predator that fed on large prey. To kill ungulates larger than themselves, the African wild dog, the dhole, and the gray wolf depend on their jaws as they cannot use their forelimbs to grapple with prey, and they work together as a pack consisting of an alpha pair and their offspring from the current and previous years. It can be assumed that dire wolves lived in packs of relatives that were led by a breeding pair. Large and social carnivores would have been successful at defending carcasses of prey trapped in the tar pits from smaller solitary predators, and thus the most likely to become trapped themselves. The many A. d. guildayi and Smilodon remains found in the tar pits suggests that both were social predators.

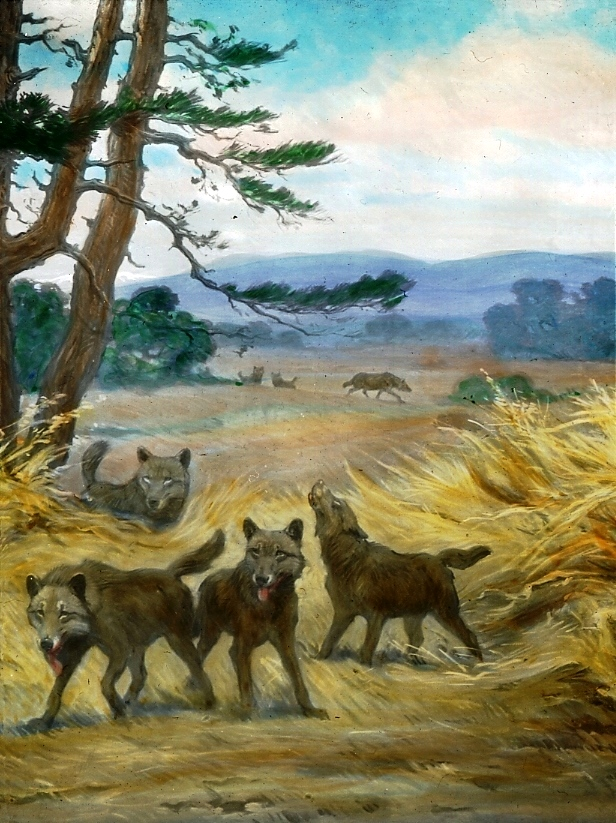
Restoration of a pack in Rancho La Brea by Charles R. Knight, 1922

All social terrestrial mammalian predators prey mostly on terrestrial herbivorous mammals with a body mass similar to the combined mass of the social group members attacking the prey animal. The large size of the dire wolf provides an estimated prey size in the 300 to 600 kg (660 to 1,320 lb) range. Stable isotope analysis of dire wolf bones provides evidence that they had a preference for consuming ruminants such as bison rather than other herbivores but moved to other prey when food became scarce, and occasionally scavenged on beached whales along the Pacific coast when available. A pack of timber wolves can bring down a 500 kg (1,100 lb) moose that is their preferred prey, and a pack of dire wolves bringing down a bison is conceivable. Although some studies have suggested that because of tooth breakage, the dire wolf must have gnawed bones and may have been a scavenger, its widespread occurrence and the more gracile limbs of the dire wolf indicate a predator. Like the gray wolf today, the dire wolf probably used its post-carnassial molars to gain access to marrow, but the dire wolf's larger size enabled it to crack larger bones.

==== Tooth breakage ====
Dentition of an Ice Age wolf

Tooth breakage is related to a carnivore's behavior. A study of nine modern carnivores found that one in four adults had suffered tooth breakage and that half of these breakages were of the canine teeth. The most breakage occurred in the spotted hyena that consumes all of its prey including the bone; the least breakage occurred in the African wild dog, and the gray wolf ranked in between these two. The eating of bone increases the risk of accidental fracture due to the relatively high, unpredictable stresses that it creates. The most commonly broken teeth are the canines, followed by the premolars, carnassial molars, and incisors. Canines are the teeth most likely to break because of their shape and function, which subjects them to bending stresses that are unpredictable in both direction and magnitude. The risk of tooth fracture is also higher when killing large prey.

A study of the fossil remains of large carnivores from La Brea pits dated 36,000–10,000 YBP shows tooth breakage rates of 5–17% for the dire wolf, coyote, American lion, and Smilodon, compared to 0.5–2.7% for ten modern predators. These higher fracture rates were across all teeth, but the fracture rates for the canine teeth were the same as in modern carnivores. The dire wolf broke its incisors more often than the modern gray wolf; thus, it has been proposed that the dire wolf used its incisors closer to the bone when feeding. Dire wolf fossils from Mexico and Peru show a similar pattern of breakage. A 1993 study proposed that the higher frequency of tooth breakage among Pleistocene carnivores than among living carnivores was not the result of hunting larger game, something that might be assumed from the larger size of the former. When there is low prey availability, the competition between carnivores increases, causing them to eat faster and thus consume more bone, leading to tooth breakage. As their prey became extinct around 10,000 years ago, so did these Pleistocene carnivores, except for the coyote (which is an omnivore).

Display with labelled teeth on a La Brea dire wolf skull

A later La Brea pits study compared tooth breakage of dire wolves in two time periods. One pit contained fossil dire wolves dated 15,000 YBP and another dated 13,000 YBP. The results showed that the 15,000 YBP dire wolves had three times more tooth breakage than the 13,000 YBP dire wolves, whose breakage matched those of nine modern carnivores. The study concluded that between 15,000 and 14,000 YBP prey availability was less or competition was higher for dire wolves and that by 13,000 YBP, as the prey species moved towards extinction, predator competition had declined and therefore the frequency of tooth breakage in dire wolves had also declined.

Carnivores include both pack hunters and solitary hunters. The solitary hunter depends on a powerful bite at the canine teeth to subdue their prey, and thus exhibits a strong mandibular symphysis. In contrast, a pack hunter, which delivers many shallower bites, has a comparably weaker mandibular symphysis. Thus, researchers can use the strength of the mandibular symphysis in fossil carnivore specimens to determine what kind of hunter it was – a pack hunter or a solitary hunter – and even how it consumed its prey. The mandibles of canids are buttressed behind the carnassial teeth to enable the animals to crack bones with their post-carnassial teeth (molars M2 and M3). A study found that the mandible buttress profile of the dire wolf was lower than that of the gray wolf and the red wolf, but very similar to the coyote and the African hunting dog. The dorsoventrally weak symphyseal region (in comparison to premolars P3 and P4) of the dire wolf indicates that it delivered shallow bites similar to its modern relatives and was therefore a pack hunter. This suggests that the dire wolf may have processed bone but was not as well adapted for it as was the gray wolf. The fact that the incidence of fracture for the dire wolf reduced in frequency in the Late Pleistocene to that of its modern relatives suggests that reduced competition had allowed the dire wolf to return to a feeding behavior involving a lower amount of bone consumption, a behavior for which it was best suited.

The results of a study of dental microwear on tooth enamel for specimens of the carnivore species from La Brea pits, including dire wolves, suggest that these carnivores were not food-stressed just before their extinction. The evidence also indicated that the extent of carcass utilization (i.e., amount consumed relative to the maximum amount possible to consume, including breakup and consumption of bones) was less than among large carnivores today. These findings indicates that tooth breakage was related to hunting behavior and the size of prey.

=== Climate impact ===
Past studies proposed that changes in dire wolf body size correlated with climate fluctuations. A later study compared dire wolf craniodental morphology from four La Brea pits, each representing four different time periods. The results are evidence of a change in dire wolf size, dental wear and breakage, skull shape, and snout shape across time. Dire wolf body size had decreased between the start of the Last Glacial Maximum and near its ending at the warm Allerød oscillation. Evidence of food stress (food scarcity leading to lower nutrient intake) is seen in smaller body size, skulls with a larger cranial base, and shorter snout (shape neoteny and size neoteny), and more tooth breakage and wear. Dire wolves dated 17,900 YBP showed all of these features, which indicates food stress. Dire wolves dated 28,000 YBP also showed to a degree many of these features but were the largest wolves studied, and it was proposed that these wolves were also suffering from food stress and that wolves earlier than this date were even bigger in size. Nutrient stress is likely to lead to stronger bite forces to more fully consume carcasses and to crack bones, and with changes to skull shape to improve mechanical advantage. North American climate records reveal cyclic fluctuations during the glacial period that included rapid warming followed by gradual cooling, called Dansgaard–Oeschger events. These cycles would have caused increased temperature and aridity, and at La Brea would have caused ecological stress and therefore food stress. A similar trend was found with the gray wolf, which in the Santa Barbara basin was originally massive, robust, and possibly convergent evolution with the dire wolf, but was replaced by more gracile forms by the start of the Holocene.

Dire wolf information based on skull measurements
Variable	28,000 YBP	26,100 YBP	17,900 YBP	13,800 YBP
Body size	largest	large	smallest	medium/small
Tooth breakage	high	low	high	low
Tooth wear	high	low	high	low
Snout shape	shortening, largest cranial base	average	shortest, largest cranial base	average
Tooth row shape	robust	–	–	gracile
DO event	number 3 or 4	none	imprecise data	imprecise data

=== Competitors ===
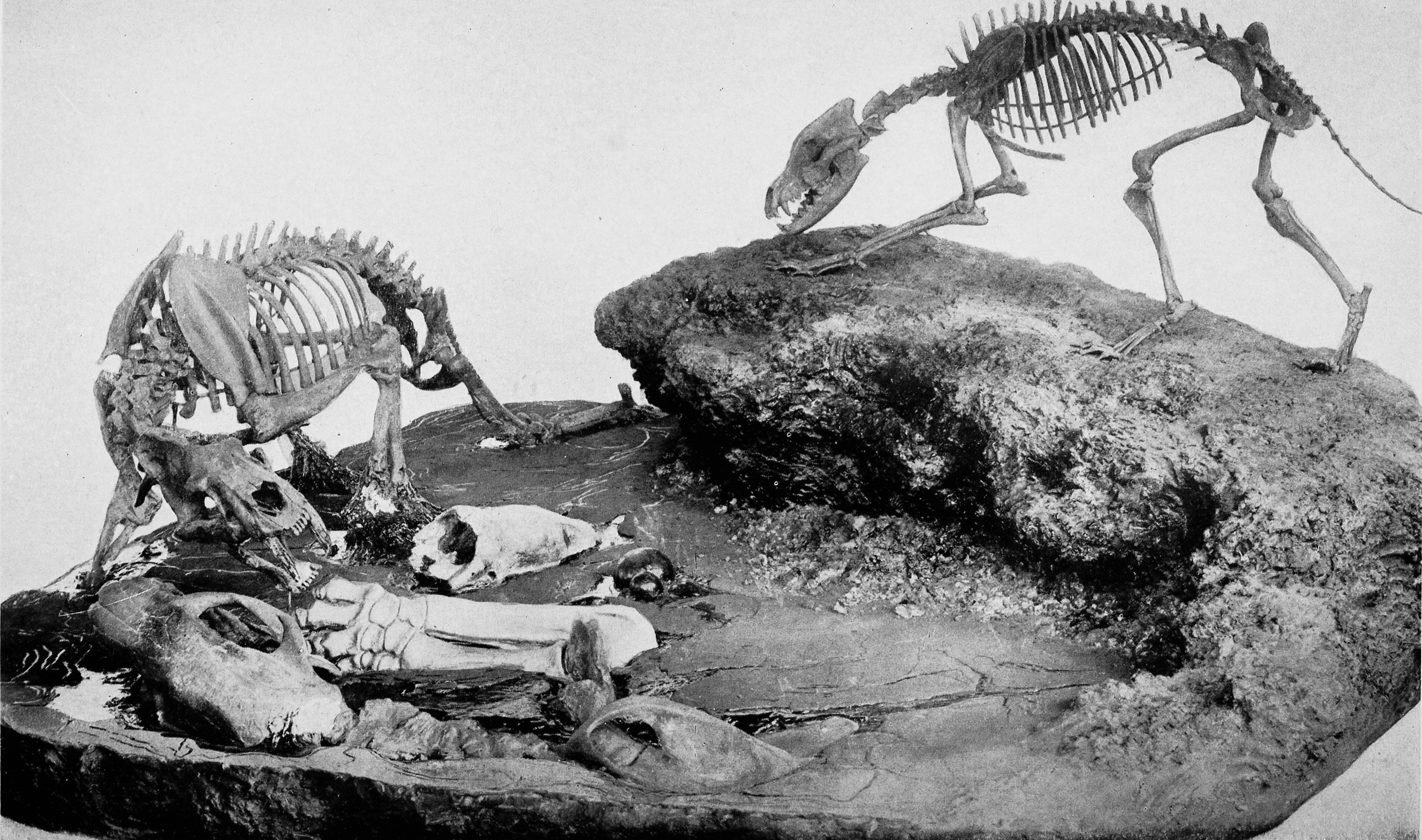
Mounted skeletons of Smilodon and dire wolf near ground sloth bones

Just before the appearance of the dire wolf, North America was invaded by the Canis subgenus Xenocyon (ancestor of the Asian dhole and the African hunting dog) that was as large as the dire wolf and more hypercarnivorous. The fossil record shows them as rare, and it is assumed that they could not compete with the newly derived dire wolf. Stable isotope analysis based on bone collagen shows evidence that the dire wolf, Smilodon fatalis, and the American lion competed for the same prey. On the contrasts, isotopic analysis based on tooth enamel found that dire wolves and the extinct felids had a minimal overlap over prey, with dire wolves hunting prey in open environments. Other large carnivores included the extinct North American giant short-faced bear (Arctodus simus), the modern cougar (Puma concolor), the Pleistocene coyote (Canis latrans), and the Pleistocene gray wolf that was more massive and robust than today. These predators may have competed with humans who hunted for similar prey.

Specimens that have been identified by morphology as Beringian wolves (C. lupus) and radiocarbon dated 25,800–14,300 YBP have been found in the Natural Trap Cave at the base of the Bighorn Mountains in Wyoming, in the western United States. The location is directly south of what would at that time have been a division between the Laurentide Ice Sheet and the Cordilleran Ice Sheet. A temporary channel between the glaciers may have existed that allowed these large, Alaskan direct competitors of the dire wolf, which were also adapted for preying on megafauna, to come south of the ice sheets. Dire wolf remains are absent north of the 42°N latitude in North America, therefore, this region would have been available for Beringian wolves to expand south along the glacier line. How widely they were then distributed is not known. These also became extinct at the end of the Late Pleistocene, as did the dire wolf.

After arriving in eastern Eurasia, the dire wolf would have likely faced competition from the area's most dominant, widespread predator, the eastern subspecies of cave hyena (Crocuta crocuta ultima). Competition with this species may have kept Eurasian dire wolf populations very low, leading to the paucity of dire wolf fossil remains in this otherwise well-studied fossil fauna.

=== Palaeopathology ===
La Brea Tar Pits fossils including pathological dire wolf bones on the right, and a limb bone growth series on the left

Analysis of the femora and acetabula of 17 dire wolf individuals from the La Brea Tar Pits has found that individuals of the species suffered from coxofemoral joint pathologies representative of degenerative joint disease.

== Range ==
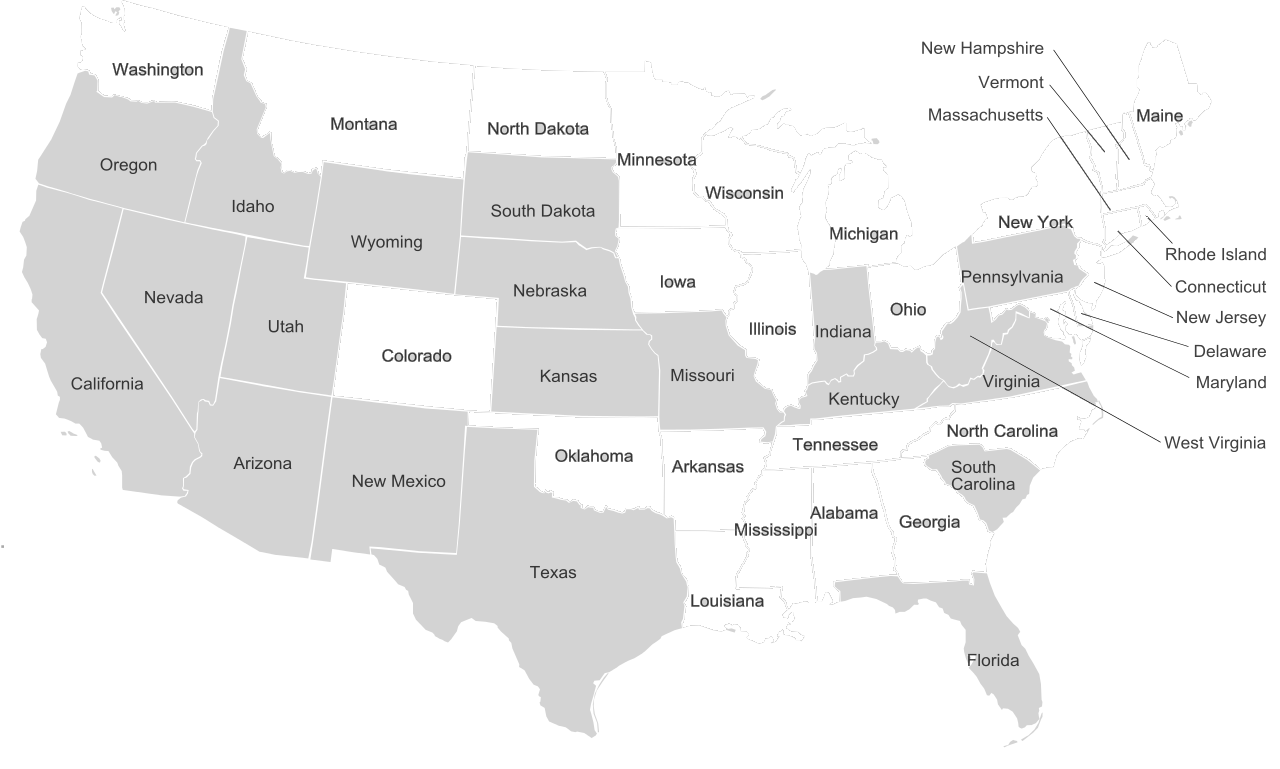
US states where dire wolf remains have been found are shaded gray

Dire wolf remains have been found across a broad range of habitats including the plains, grasslands, and some forested mountain areas of North America, the arid savannah of South America, and possibly the steppes of eastern Asia. The sites range in elevation from sea level to 2,255 m (7,400 ft). The location of these fossil remains suggests that dire wolves lived predominantly in the open lowlands along with their prey, the large herbivores. Dire wolf remains are not often found at high latitudes in North America, with the northernmost record in southern Canada.

In the United States, dire wolf fossils have been reported in Arizona, California, Florida, Idaho, Indiana, Kansas, Kentucky, Missouri, Nebraska, New Mexico, Oregon, Pennsylvania, South Carolina, South Dakota, Texas, Utah, Virginia, West Virginia, Wyoming, and Nevada. The identity of fossils reported farther north than California is not confirmed. There have been five reports of unconfirmed dire wolf fossils north of 42°N latitude, at Fossil Lake, Oregon (125,000–10,000 YBP), American Falls Reservoir, Idaho (125,000–75,000 YBP), Salamander Cave, South Dakota (250,000 YBP), and four closely grouped sites in northern Nebraska (250,000 YBP). This suggests a range restriction on dire wolves due to temperature, prey, or habitat. The major fossil-producing sites for A. d. dirus are located east of the Rocky Mountains and include Friesenhahn Cave, near San Antonio, Texas; Carroll Cave, near Richland, Missouri; and Reddick, Florida.

Dire wolf skull from Kentucky

Localities in Mexico where dire wolf remains have been collected include El Cedazo in Aguascalientes; Comondú Municipality in Baja California Sur; El Cedral in San Luis Potosí; El Tajo Quarry near Tequixquiac, State of Mexico; Valsequillo in Puebla; Lago de Chapala in Jalisco; Loltun Cave in Yucatán; Potrecito in Sinaloa; San Josecito Cave near Aramberri in Nuevo León; and Térapa in Sonora. The specimens from Térapa were confirmed as A. d. guildayi. The finds at San Josecito Cave and El Cedazo have the greatest number of individuals from a single locality.

In South America, dire wolves have been dated younger than 17,000 YBP and have been reported from six localities: Muaco in the western Falcón state of Venezuela, Talara Province in Peru, Monagas state in eastern Venezuela, the Tarija Department in Bolivia, Atacama Desert of Chile, and Ecuador. If the dire wolf originated in North America, the species likely dispersed into South America via the Andean corridor, a proposed pathway for temperate mammals to migrate from Central to South America because of the favorable cool, dry, and open habitats that characterized the region at times. This most likely happened during a glacial period because the pathway then consisted of open, arid regions and savanna but during inter-glacial periods consisted of tropical rain forest.

In 2020, a fossil mandible (IVPP V25381) later analyzed as a dire wolf's was found in the vicinity of Harbin, northeastern China. The fossil was taxonomically described and dated 40,000 YBP. This discovery challenges previous theories that the cold temperatures and ice sheets at northern latitudes in North America would be a barrier for dire wolves, which was based on no dire wolf fossils being found above 42° latitude in North America. It is proposed that the dire wolf followed migrating prey from mid-latitude North America across Beringia into Eurasia. However, the 2022 study argued that the morphology and size of the specimen is inconclusive for its taxonomic determination as a dire wolf.

== Extinction ==
Skeleton posed as if howling, Royal Tyrrell Museum

During the Quaternary extinction event around 12,700 YBP, 90 genera of mammals weighing over 44 kilograms (97 lb) became extinct. The extinction of the large carnivores and scavengers is thought to have been caused by the extinction of the megaherbivore prey upon which they depended. The cause of the extinction of the megafauna themselves is debated but has been attributed to the impact of climatic change, competition with other species including overexploitation by newly arrived human hunters, or a combination of both. One study proposes that several extinction models should be investigated because so little is known about the biogeography of the dire wolf and its potential competitors and prey, nor how all these species interacted and responded to the environmental changes that occurred at the time of extinction.

Ancient DNA and radiocarbon data indicate that local genetic populations were replaced by others within the same species or by others within the same genus. Both the dire wolf and the Beringian wolf went extinct in North America, leaving only the less carnivorous and more gracile form of the wolf to thrive, which may have outcompeted the dire wolf. One study proposes an early origin of the dire wolf lineage in the Americas which led to its reproductive isolation, such that when coyotes, dholes, gray wolves, and Xenocyon expanded into North America from Eurasia in the Late Pleistocene there could be no admixture with the dire wolf. Gray wolves and coyotes may have survived due to their ability to hybridize with other canids – such as the domestic dog – to acquire traits that resist diseases brought by taxa arriving from Eurasia. Reproductive isolation may have prevented the dire wolf from acquiring these traits. A 2023 study documented a high degree of subchondral defects in joint surfaces of dire wolf and Smilodon specimens from the La Brea Tar pits that resembled osteochondrosis dissecans. As modern dogs with this disease are inbred, the researchers suggested this would have been the case for the prehistoric species as well as they approached extinction, but cautioned that more research was needed to determine if this was also the case in specimens from other parts of the Americas.

In 2019 the youngest known specimen of the 35 dire wolf fossils collected from Rancho La Brea, California was dated at 11,413 ± 754 calibrated years before present (YBP), while in 2022 the bone collagen of a dire wolf also known from Rancho La Brea, California was dated at 11,581 ± 3,768 calibrated YBP. The youngest uncalibrated geological ages assigned to dire wolf remains are dated at 9,440 YBP at Brynjulfson Cave, Boone County, Missouri, 9,860 YBP at Rancho La Brea, California, and 10,690 YBP at La Mirada, California. Some remains have been radiocarbon dated (uncalibrated) to 8,200 YBP from Whitewater Draw in Arizona, though one author has stated that radiocarbon dating of bone carbonate is unreliable. In South America, the most recent remains at Talara, Peru date to 9,030 ± 240 YBP (also uncalibrated), while the most recent remains of "C. nehringi" from Luján, Argentina are older than the most recent stratigraphical section of the site, dated to 10–11,000 YBP.

=== De-extinction efforts ===
==== Dire Wolf Project ====
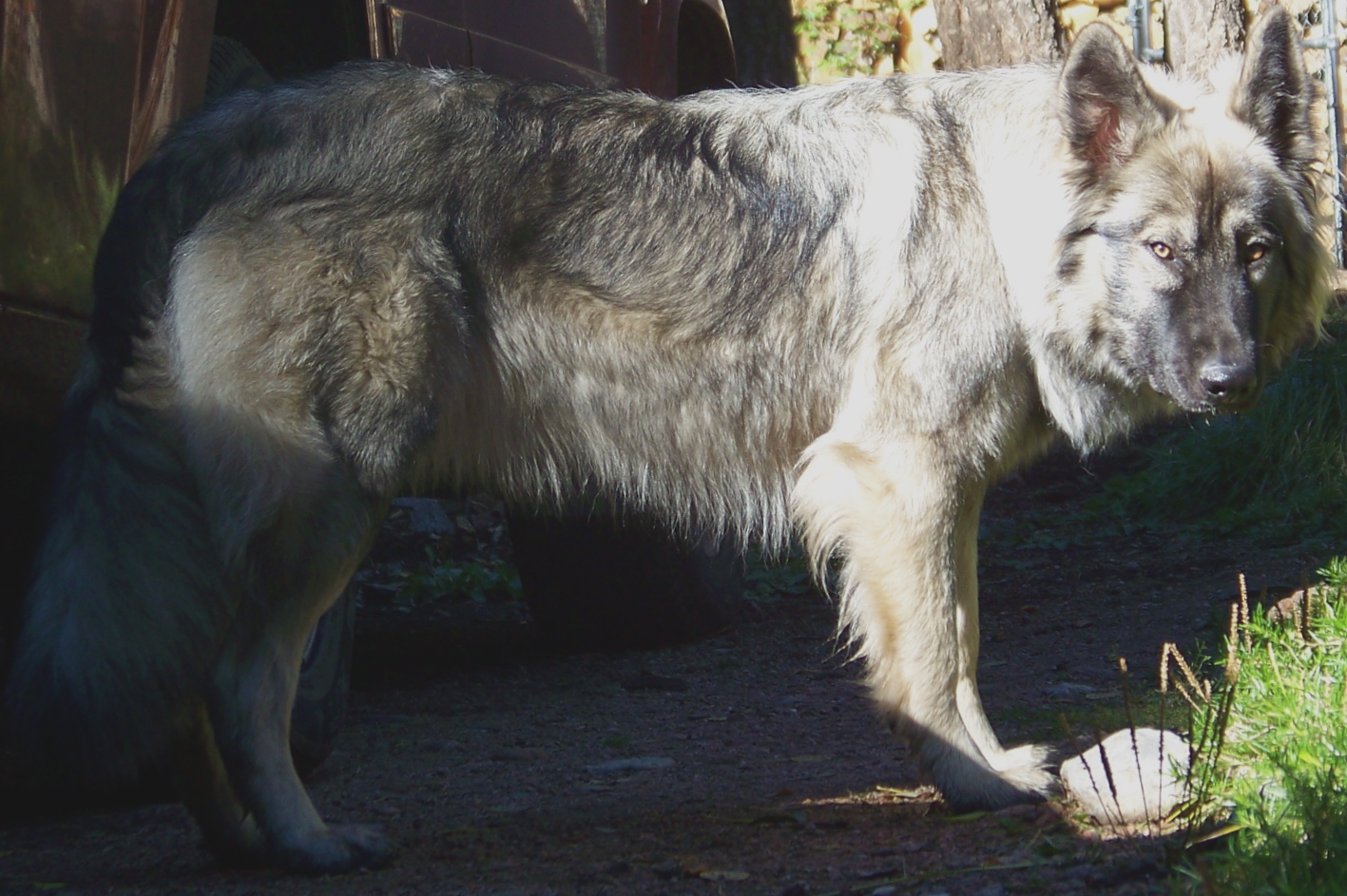
A 10-month-old American Alsatian, one of the dog breeds used for the Dire Wolf Project

There have been attempts to recreate the dire wolf or its phenotype, or de-extinct it. The first, the Dire Wolf Project, is a program initiated in 1988 by Lois Schwarz of the American Alsatian Breeders Association, aiming to selectively breed dogs to present a dire wolf-like appearance and sell them to private owners. The dogs were originally produced by crossing German Shepherds and Alaskan Malamutes, with English Mastiffs and Great Pyrenees added for mass and proportions, Akitas for shorter ears and Irish Wolfhounds for height and length. As Schwarz herself acknowledges, the project is not based on the scientific method, with the dogs being selected purely on "wishful and fantasy-oriented" aesthetic and practical grounds "matched more to the needs of prospective owners than prehistoric fact".

==== Colossal Biosciences ====
In April 2025, it was announced that Colossal Biosciences used cloning and gene-editing to birth three genetically modified wolf pups, six-month-old males Romulus and Remus and two-month-old female Khaleesi. In-house scientists made 20 edits to 14 key genes in gray wolf EPC cells to match those genes from the dire wolf in order to recreate distinctive dire wolf traits. Colossal stated that these minor genetic modifications effectively de-extinct dire wolves as a species. No ancient dire wolf DNA was actually spliced into the gray wolf's genome.

Independent experts disagreed with the Colossal Biosciences' claim that these animals are de-extinct dire wolves, asserting that they are "not a dire wolf under any definition of a species ever". The IUCN Species Survival Commission Canid Specialist Group officially declared that the three animals are neither dire wolves nor proxies of the dire wolves based on the IUCN SSC guiding principles on creating proxies of extinct species for conservation benefit. They commented that creating phenotypic proxies does not change the conservation status of an extinct species and may instead threaten the extant species such as gray wolves, and therefore concluded that the Colossal Biosciences' project "does not contribute to conservation." Colossal Biosciences released a clarifying document Alignment of Colossal's Dire Wolf De-Extinction Project with IUCN SSC Guiding Principles in response.

In May 2025, the company's chief scientist Beth Shapiro stated that the three animals are "grey wolves with 20 edits" as purportedly stated by the company "from the very beginning", acknowledging that it is impossible to bring back an extinct organism. She stated that the term "dire wolves" applied to the pups are a colloquialism. This was called a "major departure from what Colossal had said previously".

== See also ==
- List of North American animals extinct in the Holocene
- List of South American animals extinct in the Holocene

== Works cited ==
- Berta, A. (1988). Quaternary evolution and biogeography of the large South American Canidae (Mammalia: Carnivora). University of California Publications in Geological Sciences. ISBN 978-0-520-09960-9.
- Nowak, Ronald M. (1979). North American Quaternary Canis. 6. Monograph of the Museum of Natural History, University of Kansas. doi:10.5962/bhl.title.4072. ISBN 978-0-89338-007-6.
- Tedford, Richard H.; Wang, Xiaoming; Taylor, Beryl E. (2009). "Phylogenetic Systematics of the North American Fossil Caninae (Carnivora: Canidae)" (PDF). Bulletin of the American Museum of Natural History. 325: 1–218. doi:10.1206/574.1. hdl:2246/5999. S2CID 83594819.
- Wang, Xiaoming; Tedford, Richard H. (2008). Dogs: Their Fossil Relatives and Evolutionary History. Columbia University Press, New York. pp. 1–232. ISBN 978-0-231-13529-0.
