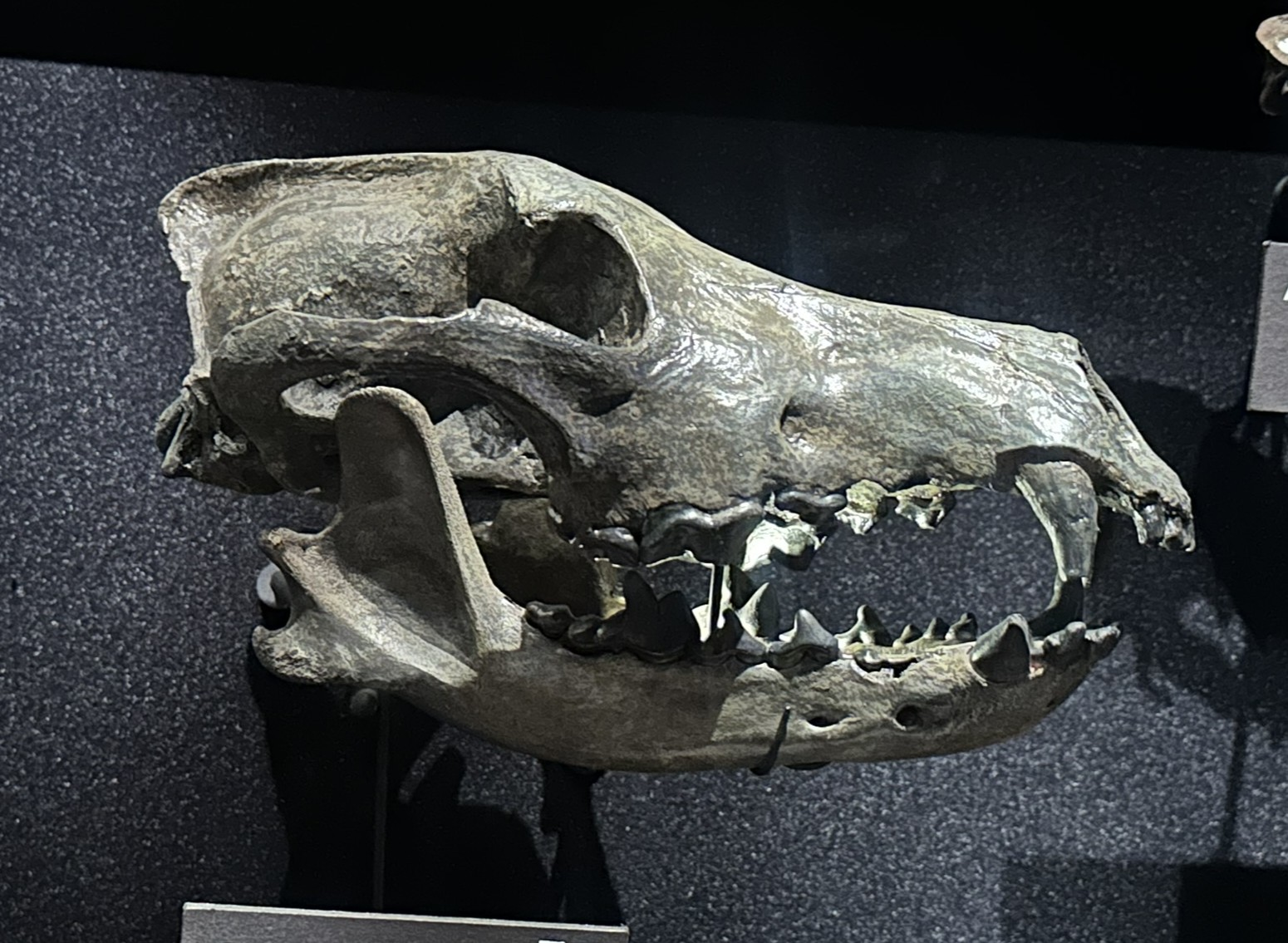
- Cast of skull, Florida Museum of Natural History

Scientific classification
- Kingdom: Animalia
- Phylum: Chordata
- Class: Mammalia
- Order: Carnivora
- Family: Canidae
- Genus: †Aenocyon
- Species: †A. armbrusteri

Binomial name
- †Aenocyon armbrusteri (Gidley, 1913)
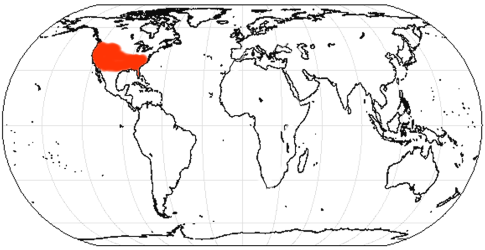
- Range of Armbruster's wolf based on fossil distribution

Synonyms
- Canis armbrusteri Gidley, 1913

= Armbruster's wolf =

Armbruster's wolf Temporal range: 0.85–0.13 Ma

Extinct species of carnivore

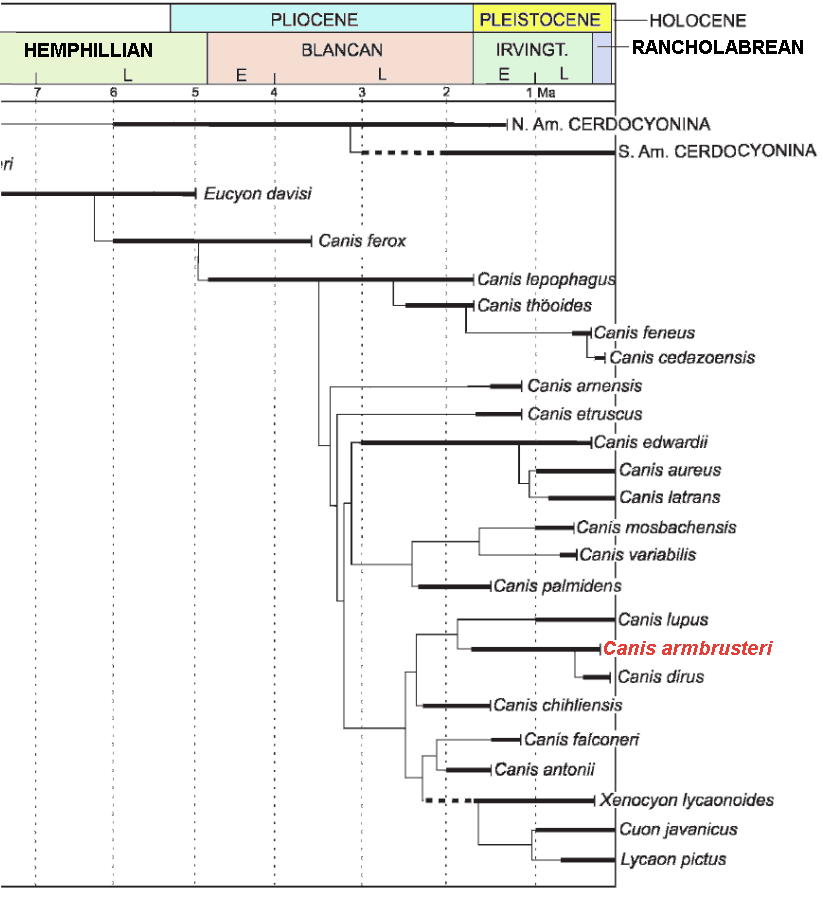
Timeline of canids with A. armbrusteri in red (Tedford & Wang)

Armbruster's wolf (Aenocyon armbrusteri) is an extinct species of canine that was endemic to North America and lived during the Early to Middle Pleistocene epoch. It is proposed as the ancestor of the dire wolf, one of the most famous prehistoric carnivores in North America, and likely belongs to the same genus Aenocyon.

== Taxonomy ==
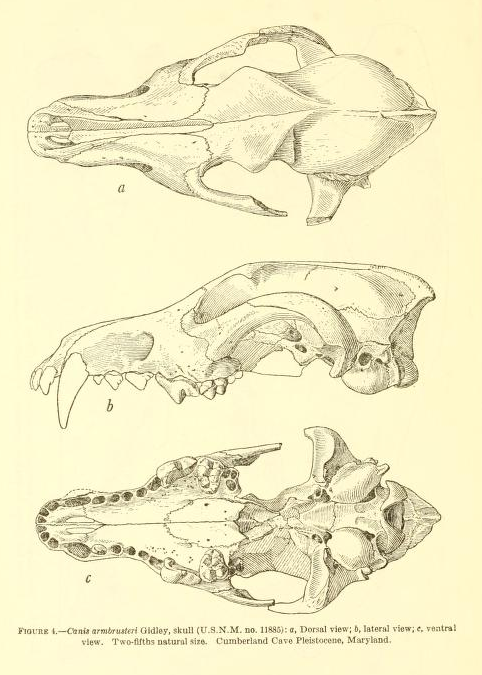
Illustration of skull

The species was originally named as Canis armbrusteri by James W. Gidley in 1913 and was considered as a wolf-like form larger than any species of Canis at that time. The first fossils were uncovered at Cumberland Bone Cave, Maryland, in an Irvingtonian terrestrial horizon. Fossil distribution is widespread throughout the United States. All specimens are known from North America around the latest early Irvingtonian to the early Rancholabrean stages (late Early to Middle Pleistocene epoch).

In the Middle Pleistocene of North America, wolf species became larger, with some studies concluding that C. priscolatrans diverged into the large wolf C. armbrusteri based on tooth specimens. R. A. Martin disagreed, and believed that C. armbrusteri was C. lupus. However, Ronald M. Nowak proposed instead that C. armbrusteri was not related to C. lupus, but C. priscolatrans, positing that this then gave rise to C. dirus. Richard H. Tedford, on the other hand, suggested that the South American C. gezi and C. nehringi share dental and cranial similarities developed for hypercarnivory, suggesting C. armbrusteri was the common ancestor of C. gezi, C. nehringi and C. dirus. Based on morphology from China, the Pliocene wolf C. chihliensis may have been the ancestor for both C. armbrusteri and C. lupus before their migration into North America.

The paleontologists X. Wang, R. H. Tedford and R. M. Nowak have all proposed that C. dirus had evolved from C. armbrusteri, with Nowak stating that there were specimens from Cumberland Cave, Maryland that indicated C. armbrusteri diverged into C. dirus. The two taxa share a number of characteristics (synapomorphy), suggesting an origin of C. dirus in the late Irvingtonian around central America in open terrain habitats, with later eastward expansion and displacement of C. armbrusteri.

In 2021, researchers sequenced the nuclear DNA (from the cell nucleus) of the dire wolf. The sequences indicate the dire wolf to be a highly divergent lineage which last shared a most recent common ancestor with the wolf-like canines 5.7 million years ago, with morphological similarity to the grey wolf being a result of convergent evolution. The study's findings are consistent with the previously proposed taxonomic classification of the dire wolf as genus Aenocyon. The study proposes an early origin of the dire wolf lineage in the Americas, and that this geographic isolation also resulted in reproductive isolation, driving their divergence 5.7 million years ago. Concurrently, Coyotes, dholes, gray wolves, and the extinct Xenocyon ostensibly evolved in Eurasia and expanded into North America more recently, during the Late Pleistocene, and did not experience admixture with the dire wolf. This long-term isolation of the dire wolf lineage implies that other American fossil canines, including C. armbrusteri and C. edwardii, may belong to the same lineage as Aenocyon.

Ruiz-Ramoni et al. (2022) proposed that the Armbruster's wolf should be given a new genus name, possibly included within the genus Aenocyon, as it was probably ancestral to the dire wolf and its assignment within the genus Canis is not well-founded. This was also considered plausible by other authors. In their revision of the Pleistocene assemblage from the Cumberland Bone Cave, Eshelman et al. (2025) proposed the new combination of the Armbruster's wolf within the genus Aenocyon (A. armbrusteri), which would expand the earliest known occurrence of this genus up to the late Early to Middle Pleistocene.
