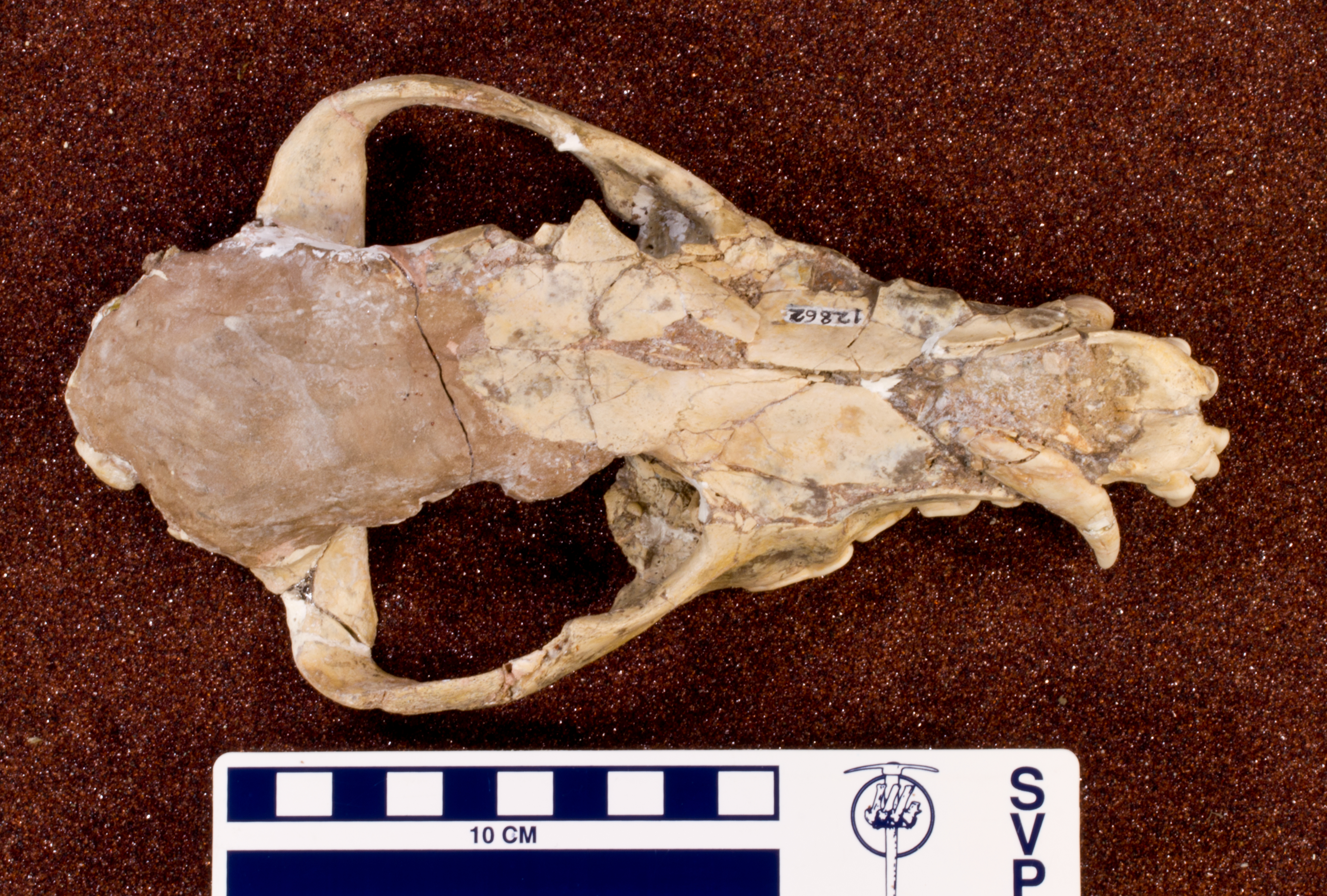

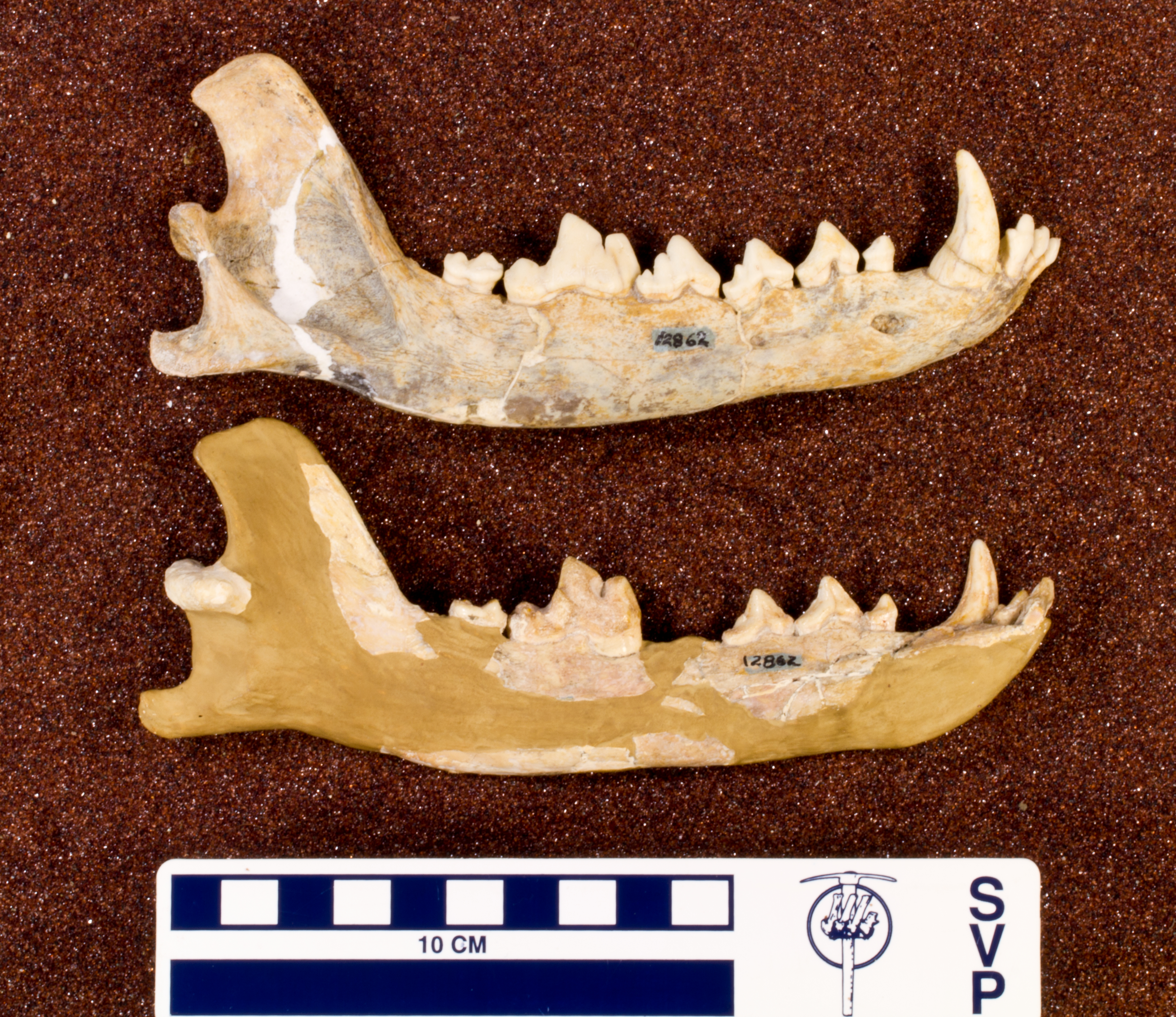

Scientific classification
- Kingdom: Animalia
- Phylum: Chordata
- Class: Mammalia
- Order: Carnivora
- Family: Canidae
- Genus: Canis
- Species: †C. edwardii

Binomial name
- †Canis edwardii Gazin, 1942

Synonyms
- Canis priscolatrans? Nowak. 1979 (nomen dubium)

= Canis edwardii =

Canis edwardii Temporal range: Blancan–Irvingtonian

Extinct species of canid

Canis edwardii, also known as Edward's wolf, is an extinct species of wolf in the genus Canis which was endemic to North America three million years ago from the Late Blancan stage of the Pliocene epoch and was extinct by the end of the Irvingtonian stage of the Pleistocene epoch.

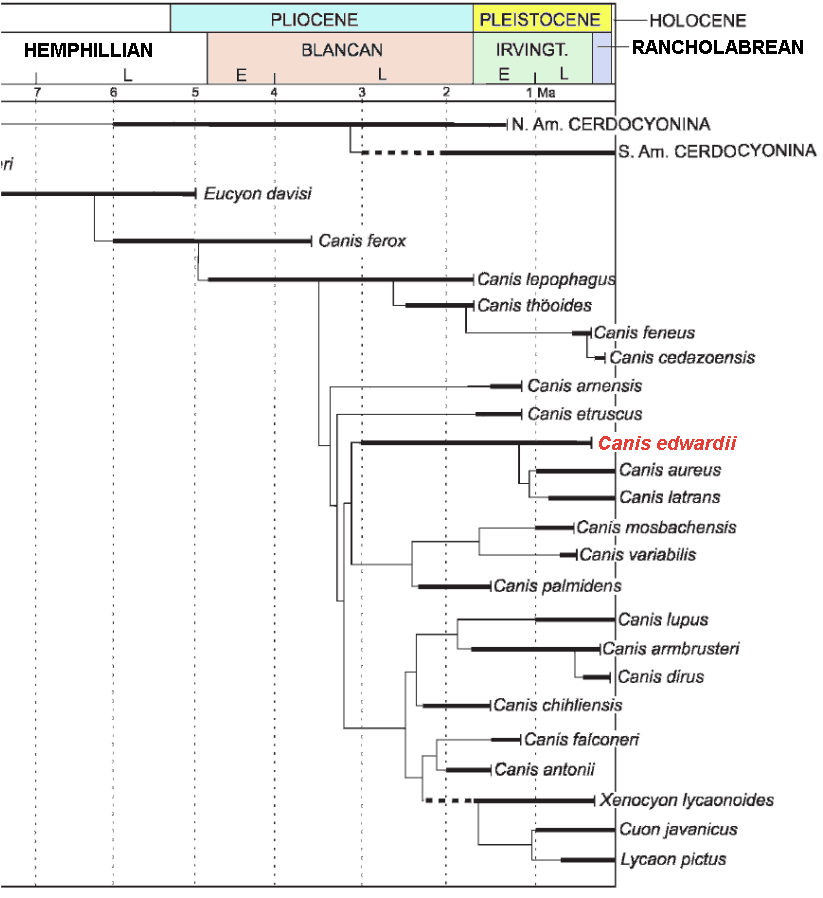
Timeline of Canis edwardii in red

== Taxonomy ==
Canis edwardii was named by Gazin in 1942.

Xiaoming Wang and Richard H. Tedford proposed that the genus Canis was the descendant of the coyote-like Eucyon davisi and its remains first appeared in the Miocene (6 Mya) in the Southwestern USA and Mexico. By the Pliocene (5 Mya), the larger Canis lepophagus appeared in the same region, and by the Early Pleistocene (1 Mya) Canis latrans (the coyote) was in existence. They proposed that the progression from Eucyon davisi to C. lepophagus to the coyote was linear evolution. Additionally, C. edwardii, C. latrans, and C. aureus thought to have formed a small clade together and because C. edwardii appeared earliest, spanning the mid-Blancan (late Pliocene) to the close of the Irvingtonian (late Pleistocene) it is proposed as the ancestor.

=== Canis priscolatrans ===
Canis priscolatrans lived in the Late Pliocene-Early Pleistocene in North America. The first definite wolf appeared in the Late Blancan/Early Irvingtonian, and named C. priscolatrans that was either very close to or a synonym for Canis edwardii. It resembled C. rufus in cranial size and proportions but to more complex dentition. However, there are no fossils of C. rufus until the Late Rancholabrean.

Björn Kurtén was uncertain if C. priscolatrans derived from C. lepophagus and C. arnensis, but believed that C. priscolatrans was a population of large coyotes that were ancestral to Rancholabrean and recent C. latrans. He noted that C. arnensis of Europe showed striking similarities to C. priscolatrans, and they could represent what once was a holarctic population of coyotes. Ronald Nowak disagreed, and believed that C. priscolatrans was a counterpart to the European C. etruscus. Kurtén later proposed that both C. priscolatrans and C. etruscus were part of a group which led to C. lupus, but was not sure if they evolved separately from C. lepophagus or a possible common ancestor that was derived from C. lepophagus.

The remains of the larger coyote-like C. edwardii have been found in the later Pliocene in the Southwestern USA along with C. lepophagus, which indicates a descent. Tedford recognised C. edwardii and found that the craniodental morphology of C. priscolatrans fell inside that of C. edwardii such that the species name C. priscolatrans was doubtful (nomen dubium).

=== Lineage ===
In 2021, researchers sequenced the nuclear DNA (from the cell nucleus) of the dire wolf. The sequences indicate the dire wolf to be a highly divergent lineage which last shared a most recent common ancestor with the wolf-like canines 5.7 million years ago, with morphological similarities with the grey wolf being convergent evolution. The study's findings are consistent with the previously proposed taxonomic classification of the dire wolf as genus Aenocyon. The study proposes an early origin of the dire wolf lineage in the Americas, and that this geographic isolation allowed them to develop a degree of reproductive isolation since their divergence 5.7 million years ago. Coyotes, dholes, gray wolves, and the extinct Xenocyon evolved in Eurasia and expanded into North America relatively recently during the Late Pleistocene, therefore there was no admixture with the dire wolf. The long-term isolation of the dire wolf lineage implies that other American fossil taxa, including C. armbrusteri and C. edwardii, may also belong to the dire wolf's lineage.

In the 2024 study, Armbruster's wolf as a species of Aenocyon was considered plausible, while C. edwardii is considered more closely related to the modern coyote.

== Description ==
C. edwardii was larger than C. latrans and differs in skull and some tooth proportions, under this idea C. edwardii was a modest sized canid. C.edwardii is stated to be equivalent in size to the red wolf, with an average individual of C. edwardii weighing 25 kg (55 lb). A study of isotopes showed C. edwardii had a dietary overlap with the saber toothed cat Smilodon gracilis, the large size of Smilodon gracilis and its similar sized prey implied C. edwardii might have hunted in packs due to the size of the prey included in the study.
