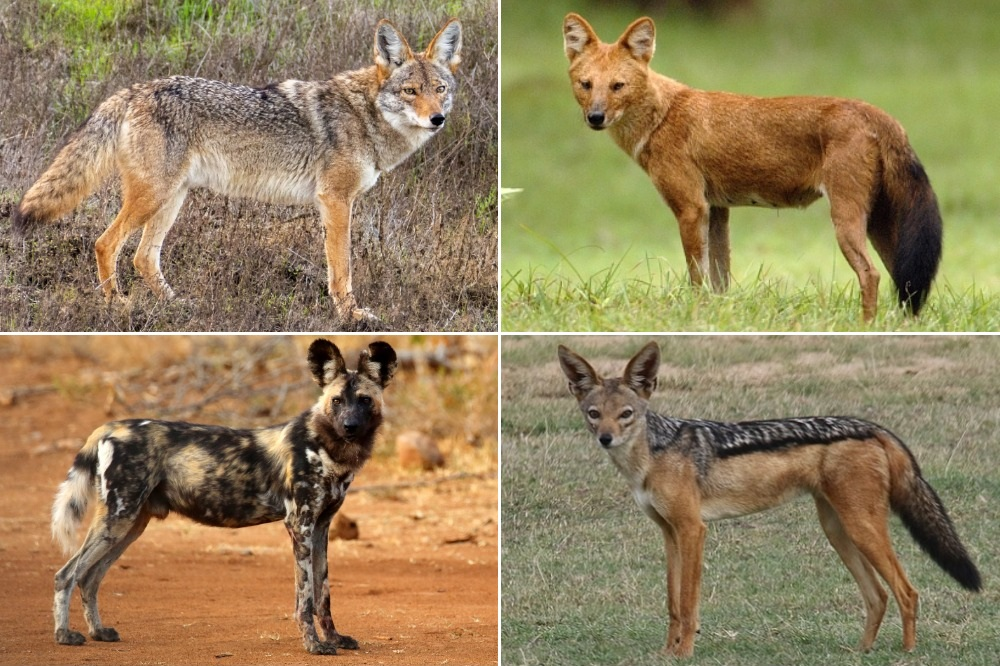

Scientific classification
- Kingdom: Animalia
- Phylum: Chordata
- Class: Mammalia
- Order: Carnivora
- Family: Canidae
- Subfamily: Caninae
- Tribe: Canini
- Subtribe: Canina; Fischer de Waldheim, 1817

Genera and subgenera
- Canis; †Xenocyon; Cuon; Lupulella; Lycaon; †Cynotherium; †Eucyon; †Aenocyon

= Canina (subtribe) =

Caninans Temporal range: Late Miocene–present (7 million years BP)

Subtribe of carnivores

Canina is a taxon which represents the wolf-like subtribe of the tribe Canini, and is sister to the subtribe Cerdocyonina. Fossils of this group date to 5 million years ago; however, they are likely to have been in existence 9 million years ago. Its members as a group are colloquially known as the wolf-like canids.

== Taxonomy ==
This subtribe is defined by two synapomorphies: A zygoma that is strongly arched dorsoventrally, and the usual presence of a second posterior cusp on p4 lying between the first posterior cusp and the cingulum.

— Richard H. Tedford

Members of the subtribe Canina are able to produce canid hybrids due to their shared karyotype of 78 chromosomes arranged in 39 pairs.

The cladogram below is based on the phylogeny of Lindblad-Toh et al. (2005), modified to incorporate recent findings on Canis species.

- Canina
  - - - - - - - - - - Canis rufus (red wolf)
                    - Canis lycaon (eastern wolf)
                  - Canis latrans (coyote)
                - Canis lupus (grey wolf)
                - Canis familiaris (Dog)
              - Canis lupaster (African wolf)
            - Canis simensis (Ethiopian wolf)
          - Canis aureus (golden jackal)
        - Cuon alpinus (dhole)
      - Lycaon pictus (African wild dog)
    - - Lupulella adusta (side-striped jackal)
      - Lupulella mesomelas (black-backed jackal)
  - - † Aenocyon dirus (dire wolf)
