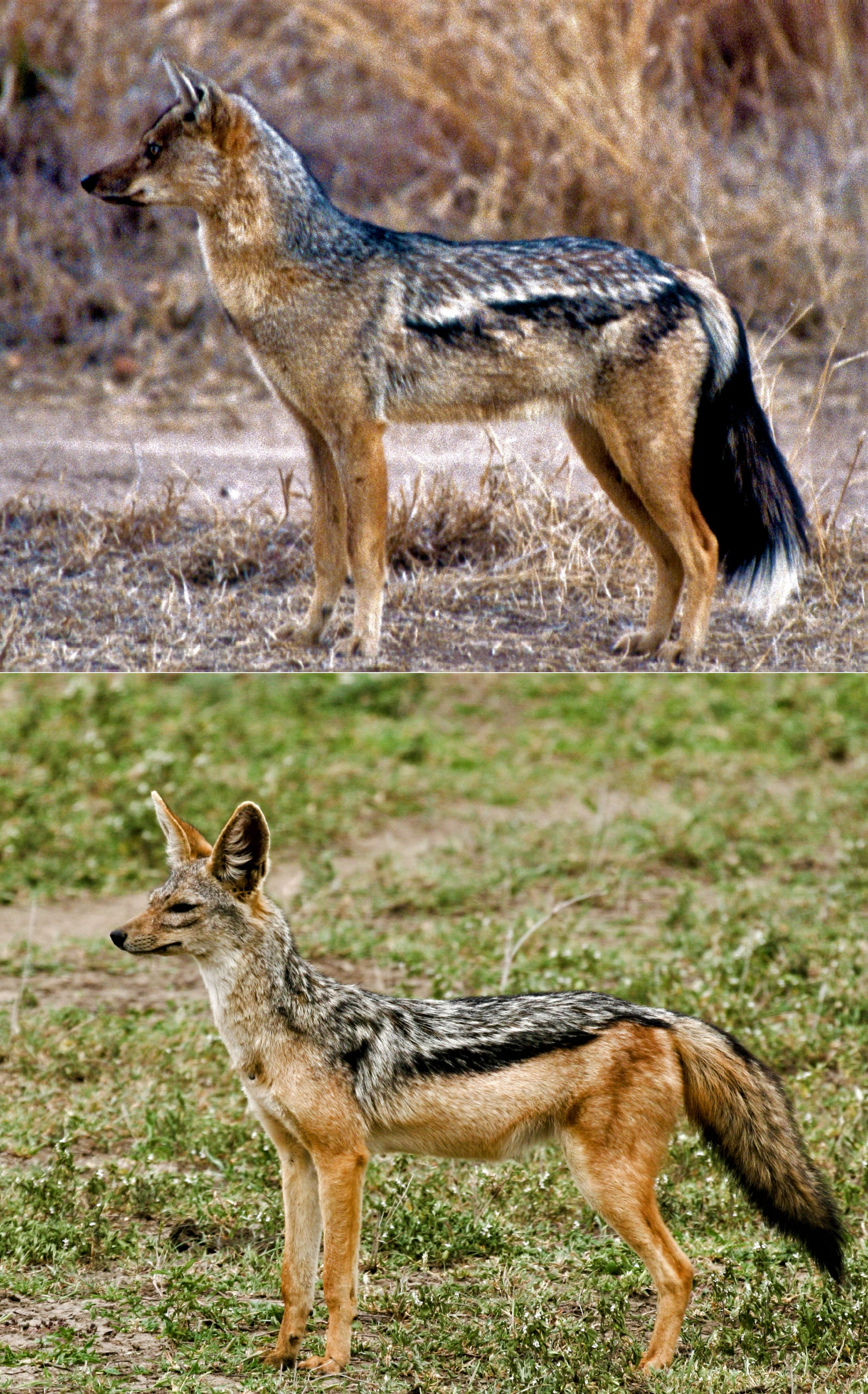
- Side-striped and black-backed jackals

Scientific classification
- Kingdom: Animalia
- Phylum: Chordata
- Class: Mammalia
- Order: Carnivora
- Family: Canidae
- Subfamily: Caninae
- Tribe: Canini
- Subtribe: Canina
- Genus: Lupulella; Hilzheimer, 1906

Type species
- Canis mesomelas Schreber, 1775

Species
- Lupulella adusta; Lupulella mesomelas
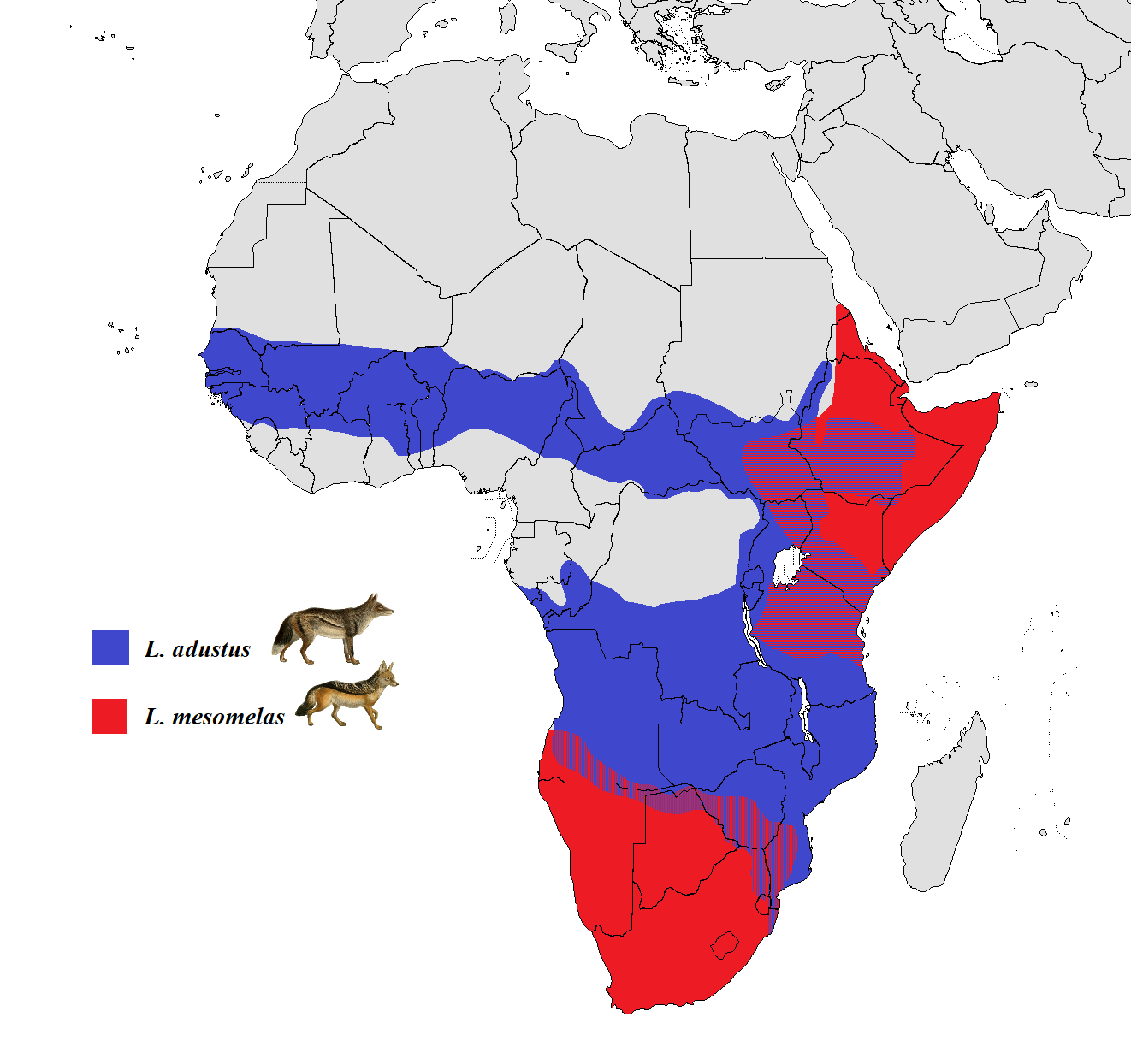
- Lupulella range Lupulella adusta Lupulella mesomelas

= Lupulella =

Lupulella Temporal range: Pliocene - recent

Genus of jackals native to Africa

Lupulella is a genus of canine found in Africa. This genus consists of only two extant species, the black-backed jackal (Lupulella mesomelas) and the side-striped jackal (Lupulella adusta).

== Taxonomy ==
The two species had previously been considered members of the genus Canis. In 2017, a taxonomic review recommended that these two species be recognised as genus Lupulella. In response to this review, the American Society of Mammalogists recognised the new genus.

In 2019, a workshop hosted by the IUCN/SSC Canid Specialist Group recommends that because DNA evidence shows the side-striped jackal (Canis adustus) and black-backed jackal (Canis mesomelas) to form a monophyletic lineage that sits outside of the Canis/Cuon/Lycaon clade, that they should be placed in a distinct genus, Lupulella (Hilzheimer, 1906) with the names Lupulella adusta and Lupulella mesomelas.

Genus Lupulella – Schreber, 1775 – two species
Common name	Scientific name and subspecies	Range	Size and ecology	IUCN status and estimated population
Side-striped jackal	Lupulella adusta (Sundevall, 1847) Seven subspecies: L. a. adusta; L. a. bweha; L. a. centralis; L. a. grayi; L. a. kaffensis; L. a. lateralis; L. a. notatus	central and southern Africa	Size: Habitat: Diet:	LC
Black-backed jackal	Lupulella mesomelas (Schreber, 1775) Two subspecies: Cape black-backed jackal, L. m. mesomelas; East African black-backed jackal, L. m. schmidti	eastern and southern Africa	Size: Habitat: Diet:	LC

== Phylogeny ==
Cladogram based on genomic data:

- True dogs
  - Cerdocyonina
  - Wolf-like canids
    - Canis/Cuon/Lycaon
    - Lupulella
      - Side-striped jackal
      - Black-backed jackal
