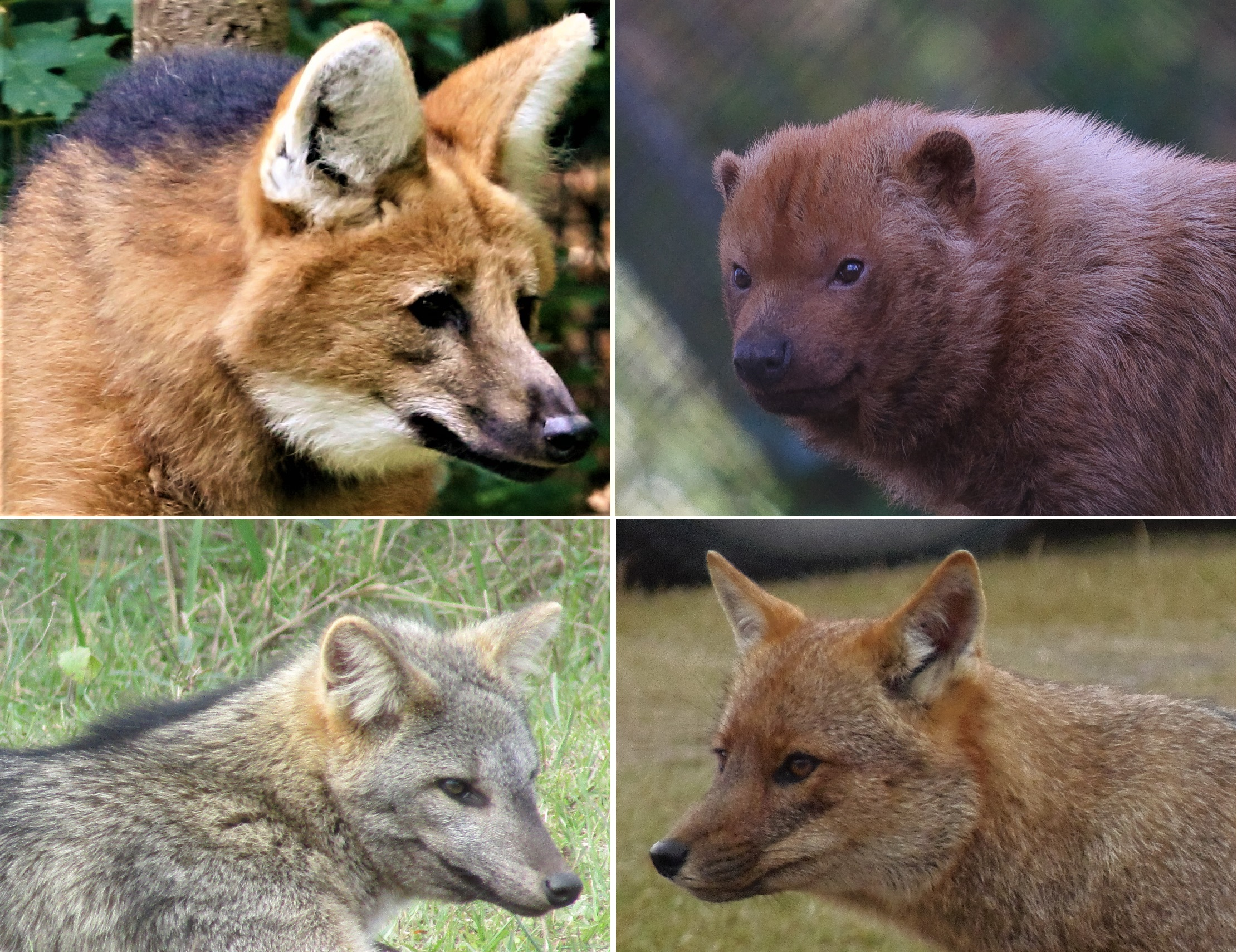
- Four representatives of cerdocyoninan canids. Clockwise, starting from top left, are the maned wolf (Chrysocyon brachyurus), the bush dog (Speothos venaticus) the crab-eating fox (Cerdocyon thous) and the Andean fox (Lycalopex culpaeus)

Scientific classification
- Kingdom: Animalia
- Phylum: Chordata
- Class: Mammalia
- Order: Carnivora
- Family: Canidae
- Subfamily: Caninae
- Tribe: Canini
- Subtribe: Cerdocyonina; Tedford et al., 2009

Type genus
- Cerdocyon C. H. Smith, 1839

Genera
- Atelocynus; Cerdocyon; Chrysocyon; Lycalopex; Speothos; †Dusicyon; †Protocyon; †Theriodictis

= Cerdocyonina =

Cerdocyoninans Temporal range: Late Miocene-Holocene 6-0 Ma

Subtribe of carnivores

Cerdocyonina is an extant subtribe of the tribe Canini and is endemic to the Americas. It is a sister lineage to the subtribe Canina. There are 10 extant species. Its members are colloquially known as the South American canids.

== Taxonomy ==
Cerdocyonina is a natural lineage whose common ancestor was sister to the Eucyon–Canis–Lycaon lineage. It is represented in the fossil record of North America by Cerdocyon 6-5 million years ago, and by Theriodictis and Chrysocyon 5–4 million years ago.

The fossil of a large form of the extinct Theriodictis that dates 2 million years ago was found in Florida. The maned wolf and an extinct species of the crab-eating zorro were in North America around this time, which was before the Isthmus of Panama came into being, indicating the origin of the Cerdocyonina in North America.

Prior to the 1990s there have been different systematic hypotheses pertaining to the relationships among South American canids, most frequent was the notion of there being three genera and subgenera after Langguth 1969 and 1970:

- Genus Cerdocyon
  - Subgenus Atelocynus
  - Subgenus Cerdocyon
  - Subgenus Speothos
- Genus Dusicyon
  - Subgenus Lycalopex (Langguth recognized it as "Pseudalopex")
  - Subgenus †Dusicyon
- Genus Chrysocyon

Morphological and DNA evidence shows that the South American canids, being the most diverse group of canids on any continent, forms its own natural group.

These taxa, representing diverse adaptations, can be diagnosed by the following synapomorphies: angular process of the mandible wide, may lack hooklike termination, expansion accommodates widened insertions for pterygoid muscle segments, especially that for the medial branch of the internal pterygoid; posterior cusp of p3 weak or absent; and m1 hypoconid and entoconid, joined by cristids. The Cerdocyonina lacks the strongly arched zygoma and often the second posterior cusp on p4 between the cingulum and the large first cusp, which marks them as primitive relative to Eucyon and its sister taxon the subtribe Canina, which shares these synapomorphies.

— Richard H. Tedford

In 2018, a study found that the extinct South American Canis gezi did not fall under genus Canis and should be classified under the Cerdocyonina, however no genus was proposed.

== Genetic lineage ==
In 2005, a genetic study revealed the cladogram below, modified to incorporate recent findings on Lycalopex species and Dusicyon.

- Cerdocyonina
  - - Speothos venaticus (Bush dog)
    - - Chrysocyon brachyurus (Maned wolf)
      - † Dusicyon australis (Falkland Islands wolf)
  - - - - Lycalopex
          - Lycalopex vetulus (Hoary fox)
          - - Lycalopex sechurae (Sechuran fox or Peruvian desert fox)
            - - - Lycalopex fulvipes (Darwin's fox)
                - Lycalopex gymnocercus (Pampas fox)
              - - Lycalopex griseus (South American gray fox or chilla)
                - Lycalopex culpaeus (Culpeo or Andean fox)
        - Cerdocyon thous (Crab-eating fox)
      - Atelocynus microtis (Short-eared dog)

It has been suggested that the extinct genus Aenocyon, including the dire wolf, derived approximately 39% of its ancestry from Cerdocyonina as a result of ancient hybridisation.

=== Common ancestor ===
In 2022, a study sequenced the genomes of the living members of Cerdocyonina, which indicates that they commenced diversifying from a common ancestor between 3.9—3.5 million years ago. This finding is consistent with the ancestor arriving in South America from Central America through the Isthmus of Panama and then entering into eastern South America. The subtribe then expanded to occupy the entire continent.
