= Annalisa Berta =

Whale paleontologist; Professor Emerita

- Citizenship: United States
- Education: University of California, Berkeley (Ph.D.)
- Known for: contributions to the fossil history of pinnipeds and cetaceans
- Awards: President, Society of Vertebrate Paleontology 2004-2006; Fellow of American Association for the Advancement of Science (AAAS) 2015
- Scientific career
- Fields: Vertebrate Paleontology, Evolution, Systematics
- Workplaces: San Diego State University (1989–present)
- Thesis: (1979)
- Doctoral advisor: William A. Clemens, Jr.
- Website: biology.sdsu.edu/people/annalisa-berta/

Annalisa Berta (born 23 July 1952) is an American paleontologist and professor emerita in the Department of Biology at San Diego State University.

The focus of her research is the evolution and fossil history of whales and other marine mammals, and among her contributions is the description of the early pinniped Enaliarctos.

Berta received her Ph.D. from the Department of Paleontology at the University of California, Berkeley in 1979, after which she was a postdoctoral researcher at University of Florida before starting as a faculty member at San Diego State University in 1982. Berta served as president of the Society of Vertebrate Paleontology in 2004–2006 and she was elected a Fellow of the American Association for the Advancement of Science (AAAS) in 2015 and of the Paleontological Society in 2022.
