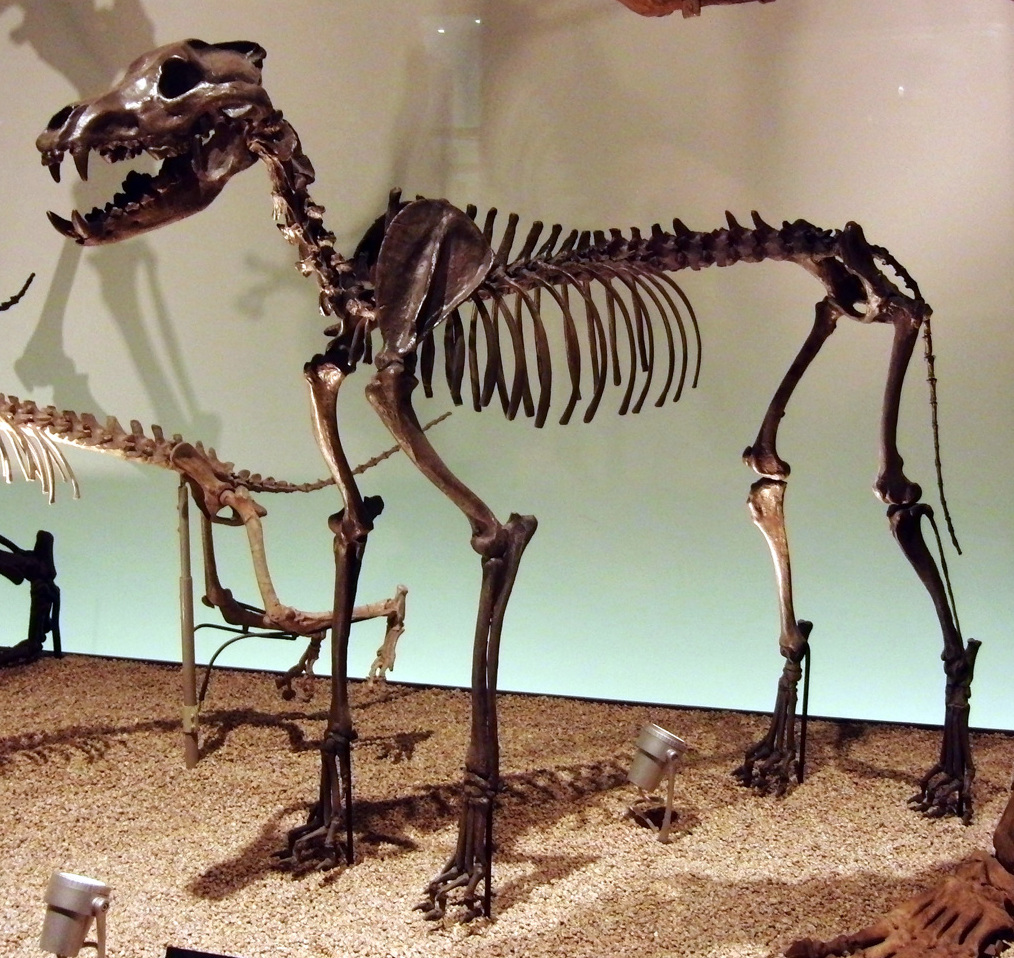
- Restored skeleton of dire wolf (Aenocyon dirus), the type species of genus Aenocyon in National Museum of Nature and Science, Tokyo, in Japan

Scientific classification
- Kingdom: Animalia
- Phylum: Chordata
- Class: Mammalia
- Infraclass: Placentalia
- Order: Carnivora
- Family: Canidae
- Subfamily: Caninae
- Tribe: Canini
- Subtribe: Canina
- Genus: †Aenocyon; Merriam, 1918

Type species
- †Canis dirus Leidy, 1858

Other species
- †A. armbrusteri (Gidley, 1913)

= Aenocyon =

Aenocyon Temporal range: Pleistocene-early Holocene, 0.85–0.01 Ma

Extinct genus of canines

Aenocyon (lit. 'dire dog') is an extinct genus of canines that lived between the Pleistocene and early Holocene epochs. The type species is the dire wolf (Aenocyon dirus). The other species, A. armbrusteri was originally classified as species of Canis genus, but more recent studies suggest that belongs to genus Aenocyon.

In 2021, Perri and colleagues suggested that Canis edwardii might belong to the same genus Aenocyon. However, this has not been widely accepted, with a 2024 study suggesting that C. edwardii would be a closer relative of the coyote as traditionally interpreted. C. nehringi is considered a likely member of the A. dirus lineage or its junior synonym.
