= Bite force quotient =

Bite force normalized for body mass

Bite force quotient (BFQ) is a numerical value commonly used to represent the bite force of an animal adjusted for its body mass, while also taking factors like the allometry effects.

The BFQ is calculated as the regression of the quotient of an animal's bite force in newtons divided by its body mass in kilograms. The BFQ was first applied by Wroe et al. (2005) in a paper comparing bite forces, body masses and prey size in a range of living and extinct mammalian carnivores, later expanded on by Christiansen & Wroe (2007). Results showed that predators that take relatively large prey have large bite forces for their size, i.e., once adjusted for allometry. The authors predicted bite forces using beam theory, based on the directly proportional relationship between muscle cross-sectional area and the maximal force muscles can generate. Because body mass is proportional to volume while muscle force is proportional to area, the relationship between bite force and body mass is allometric. All else being equal, it would be expected to follow a 2/3 power rule. Consequently, small species would be expected to bite harder for their size than large species if a simple ratio of bite force to body mass is used, resulting in bias. Applying the BFQ normalizes the data allowing for fair comparison between species of different sizes in much the same way as an encephalization quotient normalizes data for brain size to body mass comparisons. It is a means for comparison, not an indicator of absolute bite force. In short, if an animal or species has a high BFQ this indicates that it bites hard for its size after controlling for allometry.

Hite et al., who include data from the widest range of living mammals of any bite force regression to date, produce from their regression the BFQ equation:

$BFQ = 100\left ( \frac{BF}{10^{0.5703(\log_{10}BM)+0.1096}}\right )$

Or equivalently

$BFQ = 77.7\left ( \frac{BF}{BM^{0.5703}}\right )$

where BF = Bite Force (N), and BM = Body Mass (g)

== Carnivore BFQs ==
Animal	BFQ
Aardwolf	77
European badger	109
Asian black bear	44
American black bear	64
Brown bear	78
Domestic cat	67
Cheetah	119
Cougar	108
Coyote	88
Dhole	132
Dingo	125
African wild dog	138
Domestic dog	114
Singing dog	100
Arctic fox	97
Cape genet	48
Gray fox	80
Red fox	92
Gray wolf	136
Brown hyena	123
Spotted hyena	124
Jaguar	134
Jaguarundi	75
Leopard	98
Clouded leopard	137
Lion	128.1
Northern olingo	162
Sand cat	137
Sun bear	160
Least weasel	164
Spotted-tailed quoll	179
Tasmanian devil	181
Tiger	139
Thylacine	166

Table sources (unless otherwise stated):

== Sex differences for BFQ in Canids ==
In a 2020 paper, the results of an estimation of the BFQ of various canid species separated by sex were published. Below there is a table with the BFQ averaged from the BFQ for each espécimen of each sex and for each species. BFQ coming from a single specimen for each sex in a given species will be marked with an asterisk.

Common name	Scientific name	Male BFQ	Female BFQ
Short-eared dog	Atelocynus microtis	120.25	144.65
Senegalese wolf	Canis lupaster anthus	140.66	126.24
*Golden jackal	*Canis aureus	*113.98	*113.25
Coyote	Canis latrans	132.65	131.88
Grey wolf	Canis lupus	130.59	141.06
Dingo	Canis lupus dingo	133.67	127.57
New Guinea singing dog	Canis lupus hallstromi	130.26	107.31
*Red wolf	*Canis rufus	*182.41	*124.33
Ethiopian wolf	Canis simensis	144.27	158.21
Crab-eating fox	Cerdocyon thous	118.24	116.41
Maned wolf	Chrysocyon brachyurus	131.59	112.87
Dhole	Cuon alpinus	148.80	147.85
Side-striped jackal	Lupullela adusta	111.21	107.21
Black-backed jackal	Lupullela mesomelas	126.95	115.11
Culpeo	Lycalopex culpaeus	128.62	120.07
*Darwin's fox	*Lycalopex fulvipes	*154.63	*140.60
South American gray fox	Lycalopex griseus	135.27	124.87
Pampas fox	Lycalopex gymnocercus	127.1	116.76
Sechuran fox	Lycalopex sechurae	128.84	138.14
Hoary fox	Lycalopex vetulus	123.09	122.13
African wild dog	Lycaon pictus	144.71	146.08
Common raccoon dog	Nyctereutes procyonoides	136.49	134.94
Bat-eared fox	Otocyon megalotis	107.14	126.26
Bush dog	Speothos venaticus	160.28	154.63
Gray fox	Urocyon cinereoargenteus	146.30	121.51
Island fox	Urocyon littoralis	109.27	108.22
Bengal fox	Vulpes bengalensis	128.47	139.10
Cape fox	Vulpes chama	96.98	87.21
Arctic fox	Vulpes lagopus	120.59	115.34
Kit fox	Vulpes macrotis	109.77	110.99
Pale fox	Vulpes pallida	89.47	98.21
Rüppell's fox	Vulpes ruepellii	135.31	121.97
Swift fox	Vulpes velox	122.57	120.38
Red fox	Vulpes vulpes	116.25	118.97
Fennec fox	Vulpes zerda	113	129.62
