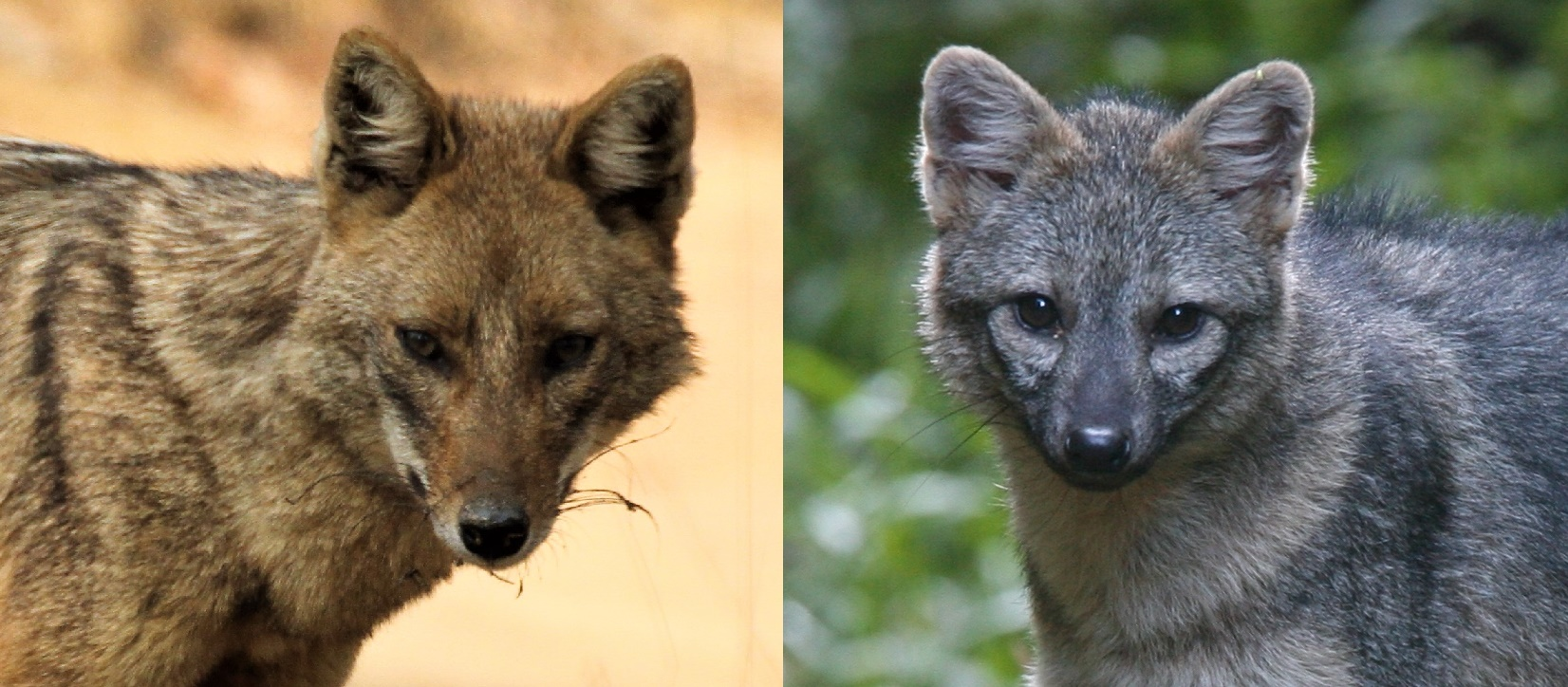
- Canina (represented by the golden jackal) and Cerdocyonina (represented by the crab-eating fox)

Scientific classification
- Kingdom: Animalia
- Phylum: Chordata
- Class: Mammalia
- Order: Carnivora
- Family: Canidae
- Subfamily: Caninae
- Tribe: Canini; Fischer de Waldheim, 1817

Genera
- Subtribe Canina (wolf and wolf-like canines); Canis; †Xenocyon; Cuon; Lupulella; Lycaon; †Cynotherium; †Eucyon; †Aenocyon; Subtribe Cerdocyonina; Atelocynus; Cerdocyon; Chrysocyon; Lycalopex; Speothos; †Dusicyon; †Protocyon; †Theriodictis

= Canini (tribe) =

Canins Temporal range: 9–0 Ma Late Miocene–Present

Tribe of carnivores

Canini is a taxon which represents the dog-like tribe of the subfamily Caninae (the canines), and is sister to the fox-like tribe Vulpini. The Canini came into existence 9 million years ago. This group was first represented by Eucyon, mostly by Eucyon davisi that was spread widely across North America and is basal to the other members of the tribe. Its members are informally known as true dogs.

== Taxonomy ==
The critical features that mark the Canini as a monophyletic group include the consistent enlargement of the frontal sinus, often accompanied by the correlated loss of the depression in the dorsal surface of the postorbital process; the posterior expansion of the paroccipital process; the enlargement of the mastoid process; and the lack of lateral flare of the orbital border of the zygoma.

— Richard H. Tedford

Members of this tribe include:

Subtribe	Description	Image	Genus	Species
Canina Waldheim, 1817	The wolf-like canines.		Canis (Linnaeus, 1758)	domestic dog (Canis lupus familiaris); grey wolf (Canis lupus); red wolf (Canis rufus); eastern wolf (Canis lycaon); coyote (Canis latrans); golden jackal (Canis aureus); African wolf (Canis anthus); Ethiopian wolf (Canis simensis)
Canina Waldheim, 1817	The wolf-like canines.		Cuon (Hodgson, 1838)	dhole (Cuon alpinus)
Canina Waldheim, 1817	The wolf-like canines.		Lupulella (Hilzheimer, 1906)	Side-striped jackal (Lupulella adusta Sundevall, 1847); Black-backed jackal (Lupulella mesomelas Schreber, 1775)
Canina Waldheim, 1817	The wolf-like canines.		Lycaon; Brookes, 1827	African wild dog (Lycaon pictus Temminck, 1820)); †Lycaon sekowei Hartstone-Rose et al., 2010
Canina Waldheim, 1817	The wolf-like canines.		†Cynotherium (Studiati, 1857)	† Sardinian dhole (Cynotherium sardous)
Canina Waldheim, 1817	The wolf-like canines.		†Eucyon (Tedford & Qiu, 1996)	† Eucyon davisi
Canina Waldheim, 1817	The wolf-like canines.		†Aenocyon (Merriam, 1918)	† Dire wolf (Aenocyon dirus)
Cerdocyonina (Tedford, et al., 2009)	The South American, fox-shaped canines.		Speothos (Lund, 1839)	bush dog (Speothos venaticus); †Speothos pacivorus
Cerdocyonina (Tedford, et al., 2009)	The South American, fox-shaped canines.		Atelocynus (Cabrera, 1940)	short-eared dog (Atelocynus microtis)
Cerdocyonina (Tedford, et al., 2009)	The South American, fox-shaped canines.		Chrysocyon (C.E.H. Smith, 1839)	maned wolf (Chrysocyon brachyurus)
Cerdocyonina (Tedford, et al., 2009)	The South American, fox-shaped canines.		†Dusicyon (C.E.H. Smith, 1839)	†Dusicyon australis; †Dusicyon avus; †Dusicyon cultridens
Cerdocyonina (Tedford, et al., 2009)	The South American, fox-shaped canines.		Lycalopex (Burmeister 1854)	Culpeo or Andean fox, Lycalopex culpaeus; Darwin's fox, Lycalopex fulvipes; South American gray fox, Lycalopex griseus; Pampas fox, Lycalopex gymnocercus; Sechuran fox, Lycalopex sechurae; Hoary fox, Lycalopex vetulus
Cerdocyonina (Tedford, et al., 2009)	The South American, fox-shaped canines.		Cerdocyon (C.E.H. Smith, 1839)	crab-eating fox (Cerdocyon thous)
Cerdocyonina (Tedford, et al., 2009)	The South American, fox-shaped canines.		†Protocyon (Giebel 1855)	†P. orcesi Hoffstetter 1952; †P. tarijensis Ameghino 1902; †P. troglodytes Lund 1838, type
Cerdocyonina (Tedford, et al., 2009)	The South American, fox-shaped canines.		†Theriodictis (Mercerat, 1891)	†Theriodictis platensis

Common names of most of the South American canines include "fox", based on resemblance, but they are more closely related to wolves than to vulpini, the Eurasian and North American foxes.

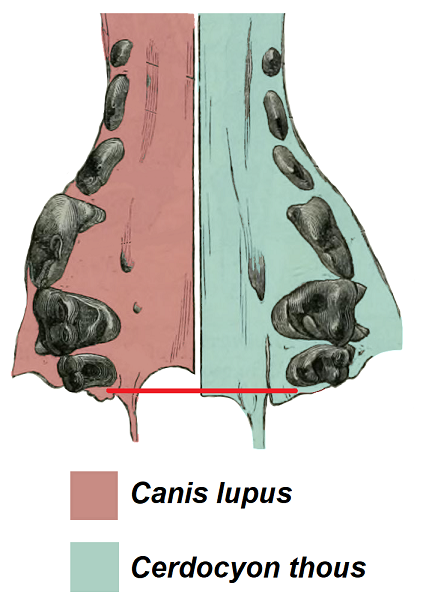
Ventral portion of grey wolf and crab-eating fox skulls. Note how the palatine bone extends past the tooth row of the latter.

The cladogram below is based on the phylogeny of Lindblad-Toh et al. (2005), modified to incorporate recent findings on Canis species, Lycalopex species, and Dusicyon.

- Caninae
  - - Canini
      - Canina
        - - - Canis
              - - - - - Canis latrans (coyote)
                      - - Canis rufus (red wolf)
                        - Canis lycaon (algonquin wolf)
                    - - Canis lupus (gray wolf)
                      - Canis familiaris (domestic dog)
                  - Canis anthus (African wolf)
                - Canis simensis (Ethiopian wolf)
              - Canis aureus (golden jackal)
            - - Cuon
                Cuon alpinus (dhole)
          - - Lycaon
              Lycaon pictus
              (African wild dog)
        - - Lupulella
            - Lupulella adusta
              (side-striped jackal)
            - Lupulella mesomelas
              (black-backed jackal)
      - Cerdocyonina
        - - - Speothos venaticus (bush dog)
          - - Chrysocyon brachyurus (maned wolf)
            - †Dusicyon australis (Falkland Islands wolf)
        - - - - Lycalopex
                - Lycalopex vetulus (hoary fox)
                - - Lycalopex sechurae
                    (Sechuran fox or Peruvian desert fox)
                  - - - Lycalopex fulvipes (Darwin's fox)
                      - Lycalopex gymnocercus
                        (pampas fox)
                    - - Lycalopex griseus
                        (South American gray fox or chilla)
                      - Lycalopex culpaeus
                        (culpeo or Andean fox)
              - - Cerdocyon thous
                  (crab-eating fox)
            - - Atelocynus microtis
                (short-eared dog)
    - Vulpini
      - Otocyon megalotis (bat-eared fox)
      - - Nyctereutes (raccoon dogs)
        - Vulpes
          - - Vulpes zerda (fennec fox)
            - Vulpes cana (Blanford's fox)
          - - Vulpes chama (Cape fox)
            - - - - Vulpes vulpes (red fox)
                  - Vulpes rueppellii (Ruppell's fox)
                - - Vulpes corsac (corsac fox)
                  - Vulpes ferrilata (Tibetan sand fox)
              - - Vulpes macrotis (kit fox)
                - Vulpes lagopus (Arctic fox)
  - Urocyon
    - Urocyon littoralis (island fox)
    - Urocyon cinereoargenteus (gray fox)
