= Canis antarcticus =

Canis antarcticus is an old taxon name that is no longer valid. It has been used in the past to refer to:

- The Falkland Islands wolf
- The Australian dingo (Canis antarticus Kerr, 1792. Note: no second "c" in the name, 18th century form of the Latin for antarctic)
