= Fox dog =

Fox dog is a name given by some naturalists to wild dogs of South America with a fox-like appearance. Among them are:

- Atelocynus microtis (the short-eared dog of Brazil)
- Cerdocyon thous azarae (zono, or Azara's dog; a variety of the crab-eating fox)
- Lycalopex vetulus (the hoary fox of Brazil)
