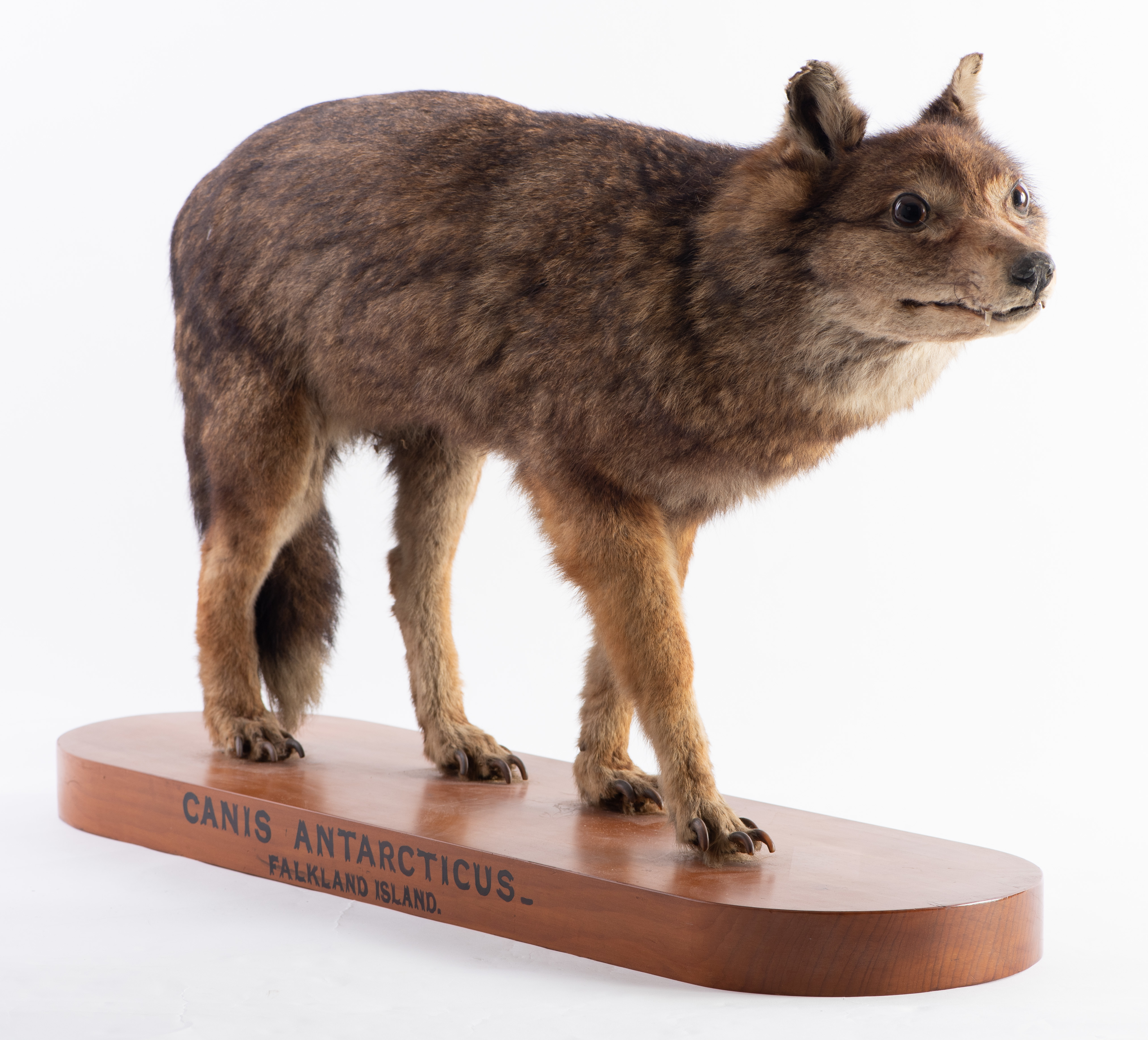
- Mounted specimen in the collection of Otago Museum in Dunedin, New Zealand

Conservation status
- Extinct (1876) (IUCN 3.1)

Scientific classification
- Kingdom: Animalia
- Phylum: Chordata
- Class: Mammalia
- Order: Carnivora
- Family: Canidae
- Genus: †Dusicyon
- Species: †D. australis

Binomial name
- †Dusicyon australis (Kerr, 1792)
- Location of the Falkland Islands

= Falkland Islands wolf =

Extinct species of dog-like carnivore

The Falkland Islands wolf (Dusicyon australis), also known as the warrah or the Falkland Islands fox, was the only native land mammal of the Falkland Islands. This endemic canid became extinct in 1876.

It was once believed that the most closely related genus was South American fox (Lycalopex), including the culpeo, a fox-like mammal which was introduced to the Falkland Islands in modern times. A 2009 cladistic analysis of DNA identified the Falkland Islands wolf's closest living relative as the maned wolf (Chrysocyon brachyurus), an unusually long-legged, fox-like South American canid, from which it separated about 6.7 million years ago. However, the Falkland Islands wolf diverged from its mainland ancestor Dusicyon avus only around 16,000 years ago. Dusicyon avus persisted on the South American mainland until around 400 years ago.

The Falkland Islands wolf existed on both West and East Falkland. Charles Darwin was uncertain if they were differentiated varieties or subspecies. Its fur had a tawny colour and the tip of the tail was white. Its diet is unknown, but without native rodents on the Falklands, the Falkland Islands wolf likely subsisted on seashore scavenging, ground-nesting birds, like geese and penguins, as well as seal pups and insects. It has been suggested they may have lived in burrows.

Recent studies suggest it may have either naturally colonized the Falkland Islands or originate from domesticated Dusicyon avus brought to the islands by people before European settlers arrived.

== History ==
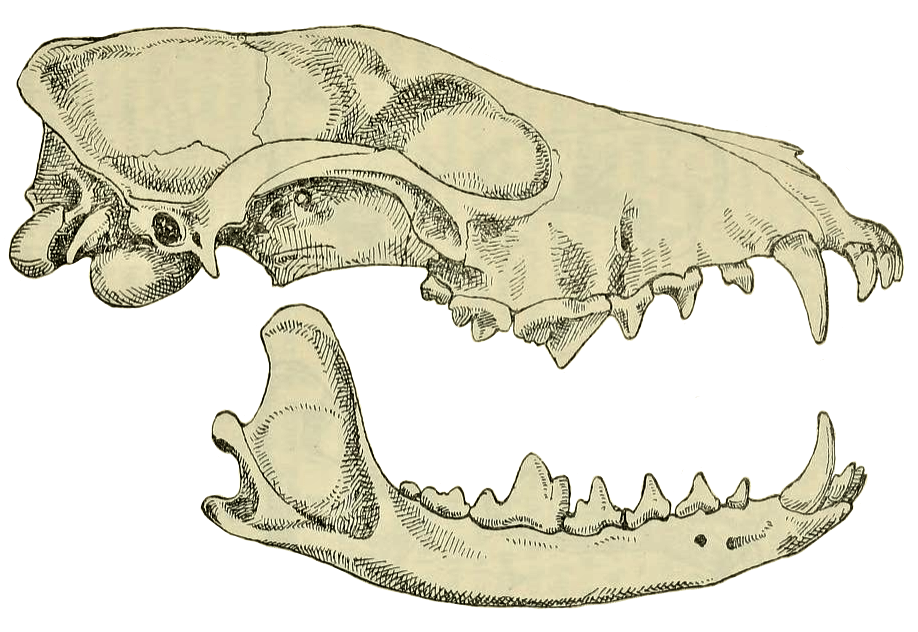
Skull

The first recorded sighting of a Falkland Islands wolf was by Captain John Strong in 1690. Captain Strong took one on his ship. However, during the voyage back to Europe, it became frightened by the firing of the ship's cannon and jumped overboard. Louis Antoine de Bougainville, who established the first settlement in the Falkland Islands termed it a loup-renard ("wolf-fox").

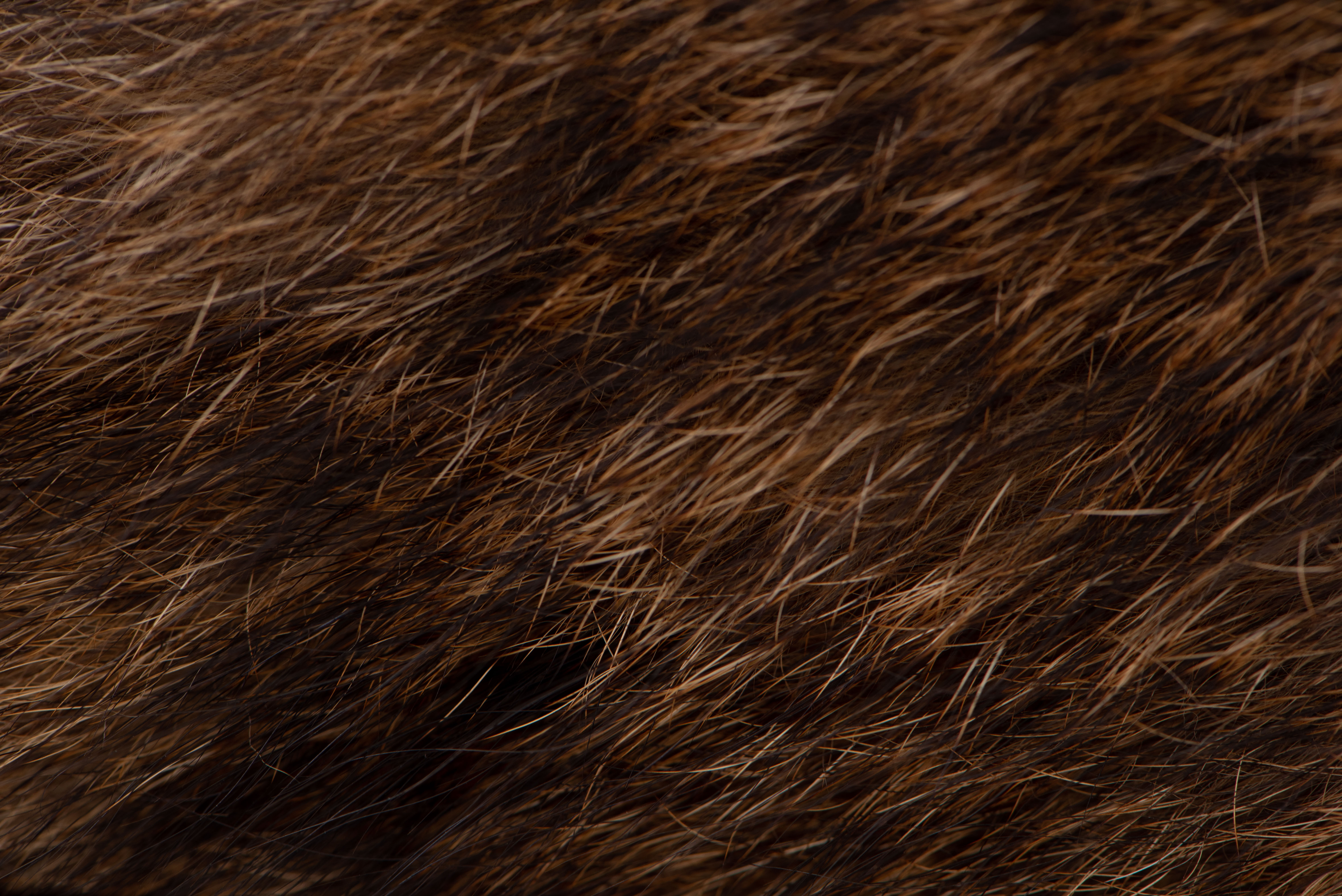
The Falkland Island wolf was hunted for its fur.

When Charles Darwin visited the islands in 1833 he found the species present in both West and East Falkland and tame. However, at the time of his visit, the Falkland Islands wolf was already very rare on East Falkland, and its numbers were declining rapidly on West Falkland. By 1865, the Falkland Islands wolf was no longer found on the eastern part of East Falkland. Darwin predicted it would be extinct like the dodo within "a very few years."

The Falkland Islands wolf was hunted for its valuable fur and settlers who regarded the wolf as a threat to their sheep poisoned it. However, the belief that Falkland Islands wolf was a threat to sheep was probably due to the sheep mistaking the Falkland Islands wolves for dogs (especially at night), and, in terror, the sheep ran into bogs and swamps, where they became lost. There were no forests for the animal to hide in, and it had no fear of humans; it was possible to lure the animal with a chunk of meat held in one hand, and kill it with a knife held in the other. However, it would defend itself occasionally if it needed to, as Admiral George Grey noted when they landed on West Falkland at Port Edgar on 17 December 1836:

I landed in the creek and had hardly put a foot on shore, when one of the foxes of the country was chased by Pilot. I ran up as they were fighting and came to the poor dog's assistance who had nearly met his match, and a rifle ball soon settled the business, but the Pilot had received a terrible bite in the leg.

A live wolf was taken to London Zoo, England in 1868. Another "Antarctic wolf" arrived in 1870. Neither animal survived long. Only a dozen or so museum specimens exist today.

In 1880, after Falkland Islands wolf had become extinct, Thomas Huxley classified it as related to the coyote. In 1914, Oldfield Thomas moved it to the genus Dusicyon, with the culpeo and other South American foxes. (These other canids have since been removed to Lycalopex.)

=== Darwin's description ===
Darwin, on his 1834 visit to the Falklands in his Journal and Remarks (The Voyage of the Beagle), wrote that the Canis antarcticus:

The only quadruped native to the island, is a large wolf-like fox, which is common to both East and West Falkland. Have no doubt it is a peculiar species, and confined to this archipelago; because many sealers, Gauchos, and Indians, who have visited these islands, all maintain that no such animal is found in any part of South America. Molina, from a similarity in habits, thought this was the same with his "culpeu"; but I have seen both, and they are quite distinct. These wolves are well known, from Byron's account of their tameness and curiosity; which the sailors, who ran into the water to avoid them, mistook for fierceness. To this day their manners remain the same. They have been observed to enter a tent, and actually pull some meat from beneath the head of a sleeping seaman. The Gauchos, also, have frequently killed them in the evening, by holding out a piece of meat in one hand, and in the other a knife ready to stick them. As far as I am aware, there is no other instance in any part of the world, of so small a mass of broken land, distant from a continent, possessing so large a quadruped peculiar to itself. Their numbers have rapidly decreased; they are already banished from that half of the island which lies to the eastward of the neck of land between St Salvador Bay and Berkeley Sound. Within a very few years after these islands shall have become regularly settled, in all probability this fox will be classed with the dodo, as an animal which has perished from the face of the earth. Mr Lowe, an intelligent person who has long been acquainted with these islands, assured me, that all the foxes from the western island were smaller and of a redder colour than those from the eastern. In the four specimens which were brought to England in the Beagle there was some variation, but the difference with respect to the islands could not be perceived. At the same time the fact is far from improbable.

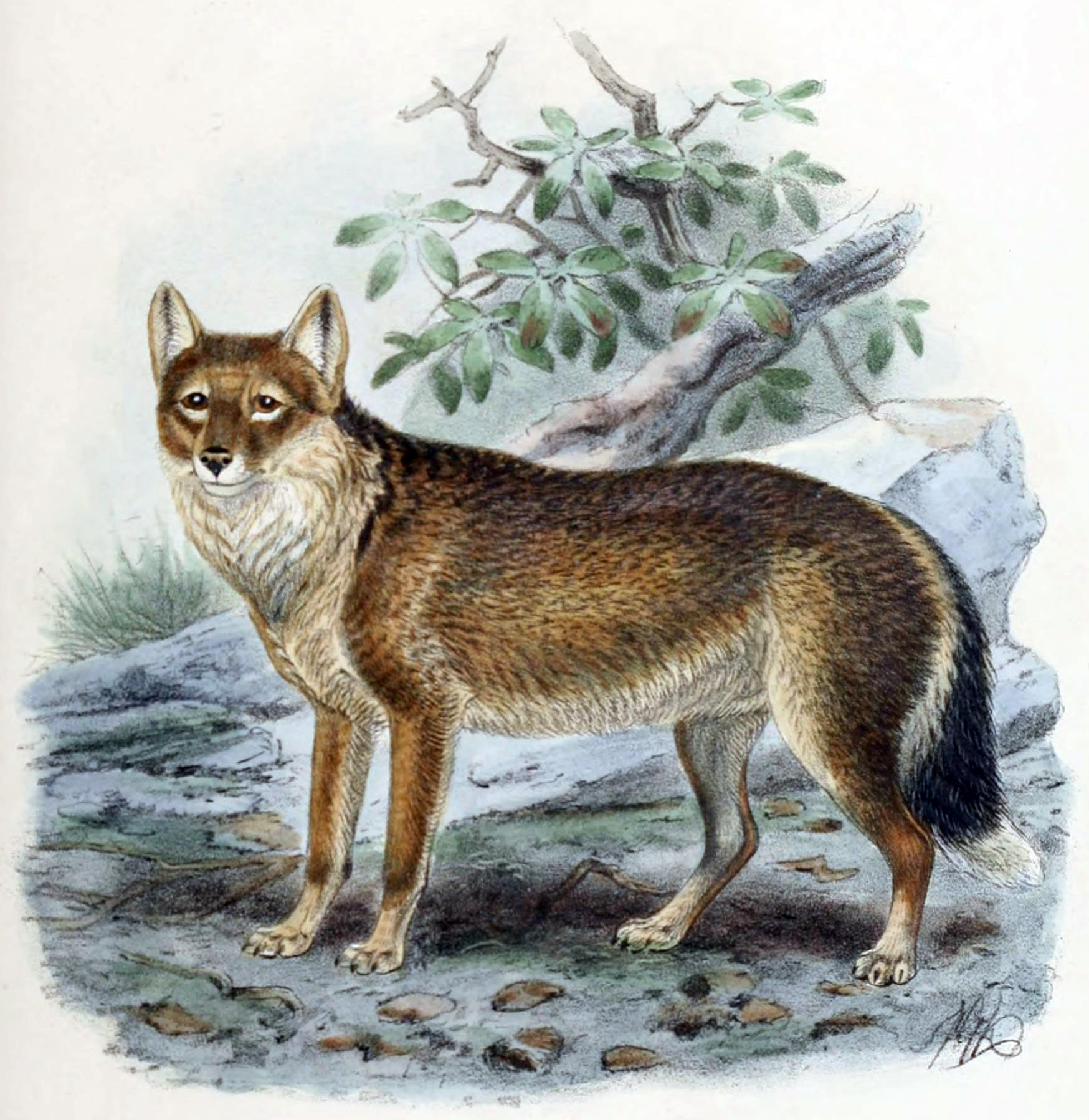
John Gerrard Keulemans

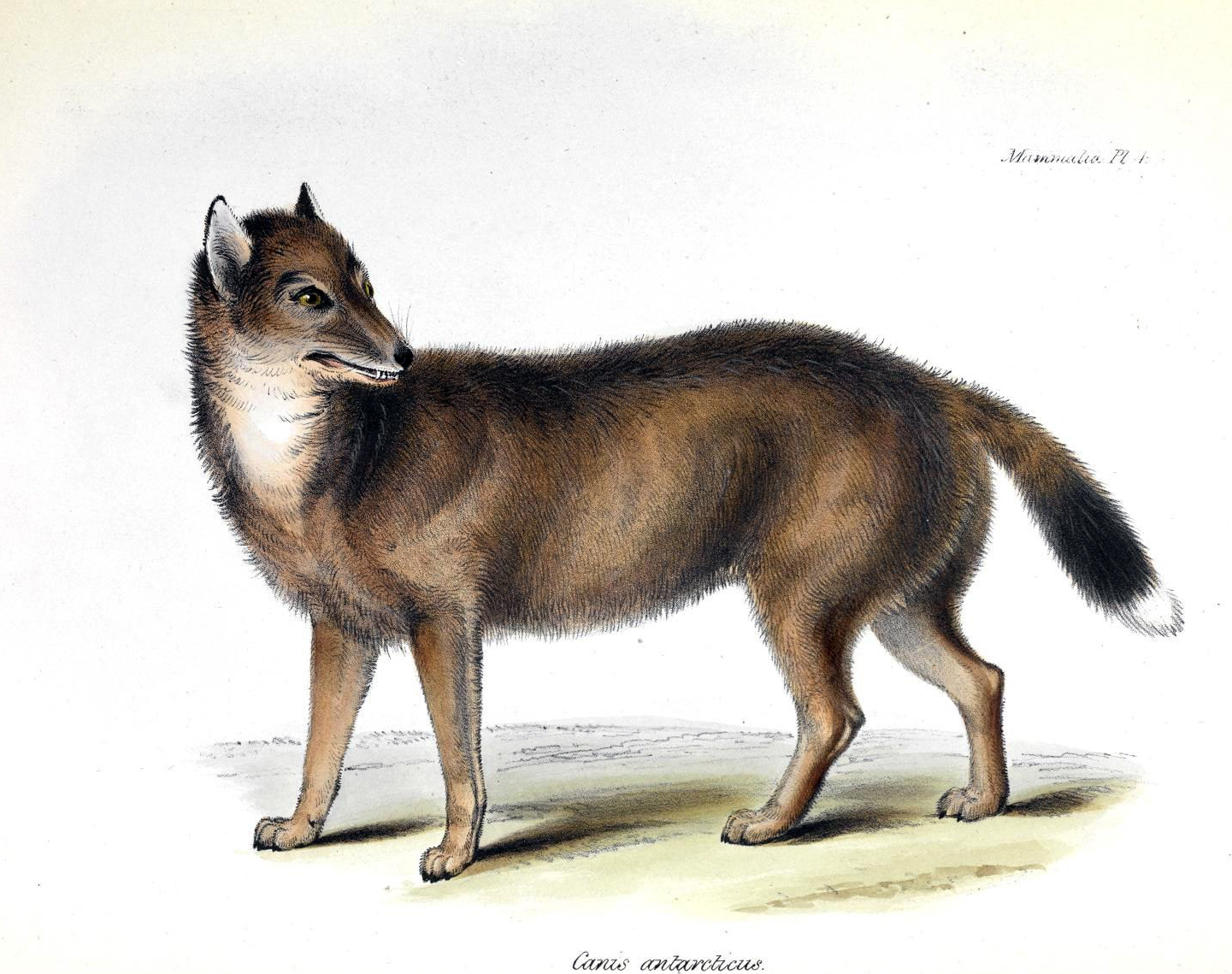
Zoology of the Voyage of H.M.S. Beagle

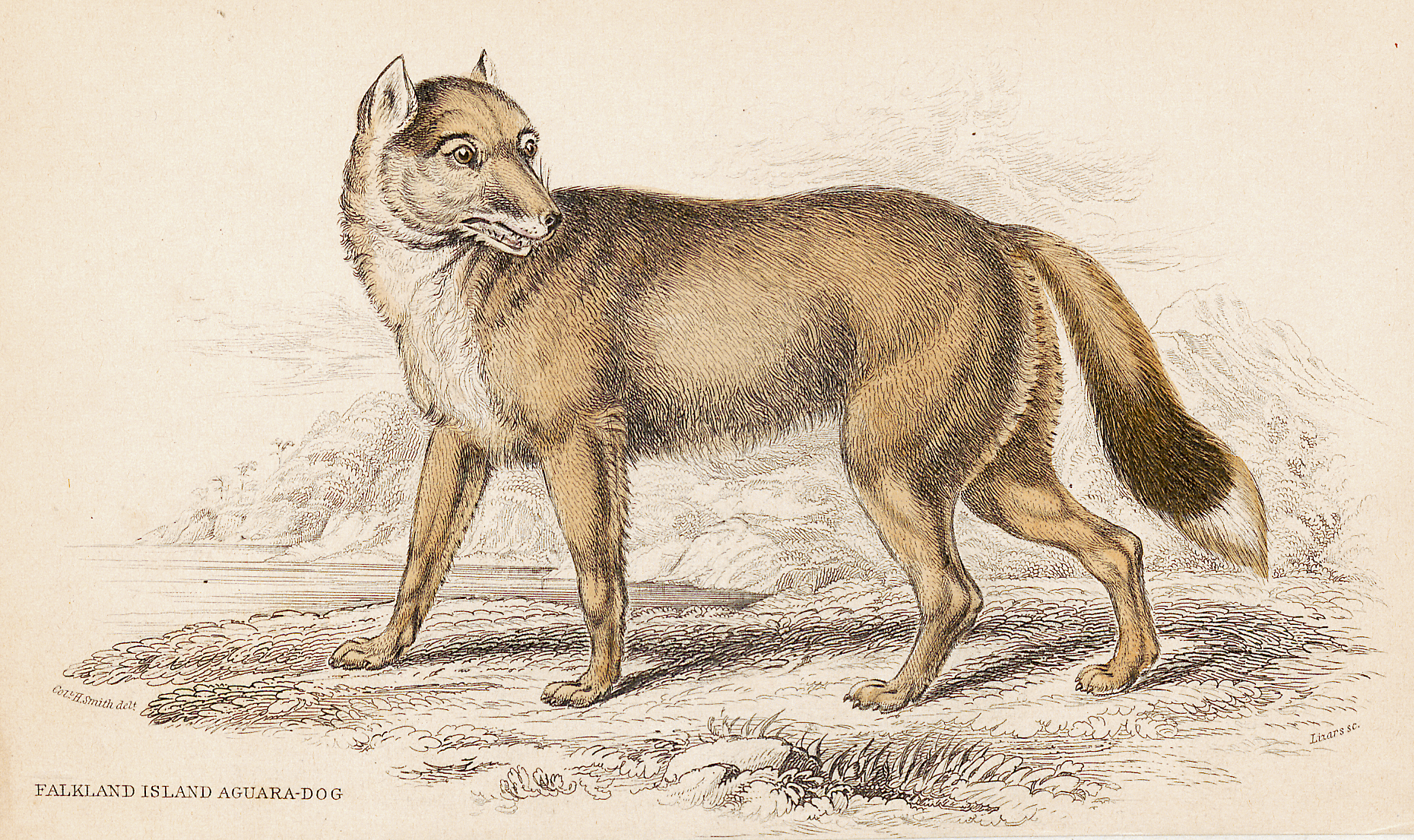
Charles Hamilton Smith

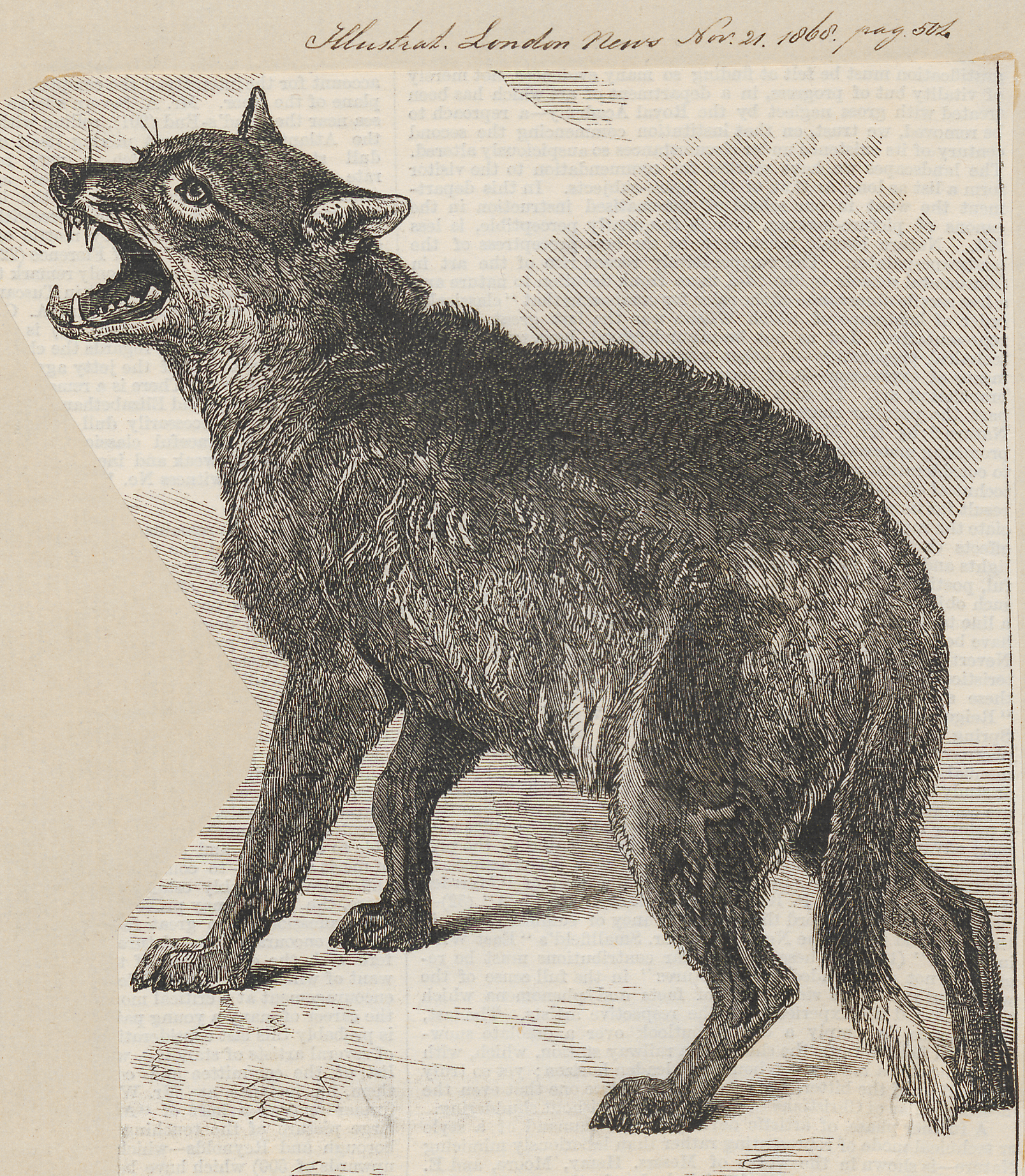
The Illustrated London News (1868)

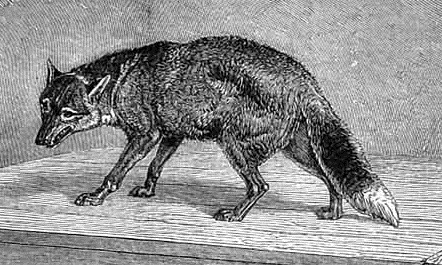
The Illustrated London News (1873)

== Biogeography and evolution ==
=== Darwin's comments ===
When organising his notes on the last stage of the Beagle expedition, Darwin wrote of his growing suspicions that the differences between the various Galápagos Islands mockingbirds and tortoises, as well as the possible dissimilarity of West Falkland and East Falkland Islands wolves, were but variants that differed depending on which island they came from:

When I see these Islands in sight of each other, & possessed of but a scanty stock of animals, tenanted by these birds but slightly differing in structure & filling the same place in Nature, I must suspect they are only varieties. The only fact of a similar kind of which I am aware is the constant asserted difference between the wolf-like Fox of East & West Falkland Islands. If there is the slightest foundation for these remarks the zoology of Archipelagoes will be well worth examining; for such facts [would] undermine the stability of Species.

The word "would" was added after this passage was first written, suggesting a cautious qualification from his initial bold statement. He later wrote that such facts "seemed to me to throw some light on the origin of species".

=== Related species ===
A DNA analysis and a study of comparative brain anatomy suggest that the closest living relative of the Falkland Islands wolf is the South American maned wolf. Their most recent common ancestor was estimated to have lived some 6 million years ago and was close to the most recent common ancestor of all South American canids, Eucyon or a close relative. It would seem that the lineages of the maned wolf and the Falkland Islands wolf separated in North America; canids did not appear in South America until roughly 3 million years ago in a paleozoogeographical event called the Great American Biotic Interchange, in which the continents of North and South America were newly connected by the formation of the Isthmus of Panama. However, no fossil from North America can be assigned to the Falkland Islands wolf or its immediate ancestors.

- Canini
  - Wolf-like canids
  - Cerdocyonina
    - - Bush dog
      - - Maned wolf
        - Falkland Islands wolf
    - - Short-eared dog
      - - Crab-eating fox
        - Pseudofoxes

Dusicyon avus, known from fossils from southern South America as recent as 400 years ago, was the closest known relative of the Falkland Islands wolf.

In terms of skull shape and feeding habits, the animal was an opportunistic predator, more like a jackal.

=== Biogeographical isolation on the Falklands ===
The route by which the Falkland Islands wolf was established in the islands was unknown for a long time, as the islands have never been connected to the mainland and there are no other native land mammals. No other oceanic island as remote as the Falklands has a native canid; the island fox of California in the US and Darwin's fox of Chile both inhabit islands much closer to a continent.

Berta and other authors suggest that it was unlikely that the wolf's ancestors could have survived the last Ice Age on the Falklands and they must therefore have arrived later, within the last ten thousand years, crossing a wide expanse of the South Atlantic. Its close relative, Dusicyon avus, did survive in South America until a few thousand years ago, but swimming such a distance or even drifting on a floating log would appear effectively impossible for the wolf. A study by a University of Maine team in 2021 reports evidence of potential visitation to the islands by indigenous South Americans before the Age of Discovery. The authors speculated that the ancestors of the wolf could have been domesticated and brought with the visitors.

The oldest known remains of Falklands Islands wolves date to approximately 3396–3752 years Before Present, found at Spring Point Farm in West Falkland, the only place in the Falkland Islands where subfossil bones of the wolf have been found. The scarcity of remains is likely due to the acidic peaty soil of most of the Falklands, which rapidly degrades bones.

==== Genetics ====
DNA of the extinct mainland relative, D. avus, analysed in 2013 suggests that its genetic history diverged from the Falkland Islands wolf only some 16,000 years ago, during the last glacial phase. This is strong evidence that the ancestors of the wolf were isolated on the islands only since the last glacial maximum. A 2009 analysis of mitochondrial DNA from five museum specimens of the Falkland Islands wolf indicated that they had multiple mitochondrial haplotypes whose most recent common ancestor lived about 330,000 years ago, giving some idea of the genetic diversity of the founding population.

==== Ice Age land bridge ====
An Ice Age land bridge or ice connection between the Falkland Islands and South America, enabling the species' ancestors to traverse the gap, has long been suggested. There was never a true land bridge between the islands and South America, but submarine terraces have been found on the Argentine coastal shelf, formed by low sea-stands during the last glacial phase. This suggests that there was a shallow strait as narrow as 20 km, which may have frozen completely at times. It is possible that the founding population of the wolf crossed on this ice bridge during the last Ice Age. The absence of other mainland mammals on the islands might be due to the difficulty of an ice crossing.

== In culture ==
Locations that are named after the wolf:

- Fox Bay, a bay and settlement on West Falkland
- Warrah River, West Falkland

== See also ==
- Holocene extinction
- Category:Domesticated canids
