= Mycoplasma haemocanis =

Scientific classification
- Domain: Bacteria
- Kingdom: Bacillati
- Phylum: Mycoplasmatota
- Class: Mollicutes
- Order: Mycoplasmatales
- Family: Mycoplasmataceae
- Genus: Mycoplasma
- Species: M. haemocanis

Binomial name
- Mycoplasma haemocanis Messick et al., 2002

Species of bacterium

Mycoplasma haemocanis (formerly Haemobartonella canis) is a species of bacteria in the genus Mycoplasma. It rarely causes anemia in dogs with normal spleens and normal immune systems. Clinical anemia can develop when a carrier dog is splenectomized, or when a splenectomized dog is transfused with blood from a carrier donor. It affects many species of canids like dogs and foxes.
