= Sechuran fox =

Conservation status
- Near Threatened (IUCN 3.1)

Scientific classification
- Kingdom: Animalia
- Phylum: Chordata
- Class: Mammalia
- Order: Carnivora
- Family: Canidae
- Genus: Lycalopex
- Species: L. sechurae

Binomial name
- Lycalopex sechurae Thomas, 1900
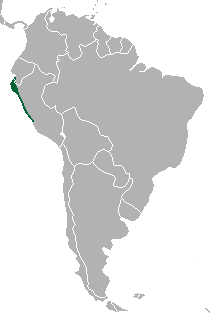
- Sechuran fox range

Synonyms
- Pseudalopex sechurae Dusicyon sechurae

Species of carnivore

The Sechuran fox (Lycalopex sechurae), also called the Peruvian desert fox or the Sechuran zorro, is a small South American species of canid closely related to other South American "false" foxes or zorro. It gets its name for being found in the Sechura Desert in northwestern Peru.

It is one of ten extant species of canid endemic to South America. This fox inhabits a narrow region west of the Andes Mountains running along the coastline of Peru and southern Ecuador. More specifically, in dry areas such as savannah-like deserts, cliff-sides, along the western side of the Andes mountains, and beaches. The Sechuran Fox is known by the common names Sechura desert fox and Peruvian desert fox. The etymology of its scientific name comes from the Greek "lycos" meaning "wolf", and "alopex" meaning "fox". Before it was classified under Lycalopex, the Sechuran fox was classed under the Dusicyon genus established by Oldfield Thomas in 1914, and was later moved to the Pseudalopex (meaning "false fox") genus by A. Langguth in 1975.

The Sechuran fox is one of the many canid species that evolved from the ancestral canid(s) in the Miocene era. Through the rapid radiation of South American canids, the Sechuran fox has evolved some traits that have possibly lent themselves to the species' survival, and which aid in distinguishing them from other members of this genus. While there is not currently a thorough understanding of this species' evolution, some recent studies have produced notable contributions to this endeavor.

A total population estimate is not currently specified by the International Union for the Conservation of Nature (IUCN), but one 2022 study estimates it to be around 5,000. The main threats to this species currently are anthropogenic; largely habitat destruction through deforestation, and hunting (though to a smaller extent).

== Description ==
The Sechuran fox is small for a canid, weighing 2.6 to 4.2 kg (5.7 to 9.3 lb), with a head-and-body length of 50 to 78 cm (20 to 31 in) and a tail of 27 to 34 cm (11 to 13 in). Its fur is gray agouti over most of the body, fading to white or cream coloured on the underparts. There are reddish-brown markings on the backs of the ears, around the eyes, and on the legs. The muzzle is dark grey, and a grey band runs across the chest. Its tail is tipped with black. It has small teeth, adapted to feed on insects and dry plants, with fox-like canine teeth.

The species has 74 chromosomes.

== Distribution and habitat ==
First identified in the Sechura Desert, the fox inhabits arid environments in southwestern Ecuador and western Peru, at elevations from sea level to at least 1,000 metres (3,300 ft), and possibly much higher. Within this region it has been reported from the western foothills of the Andes down to the coast, inhabiting deserts, dry forests, and beaches. There are no recognised subspecies.

== Evolution ==
While more studies are required to understand the complete lineage of this species, it has been proposed that the most recent ancestor of the Lycalopex genus was Dusicyon australis (or the Falkland Islands wolf) which went extinct in 1876.

Several fossils of Sechuran foxes are known from the late Pleistocene of Ecuador and Peru, close to the modern range. Genetic analysis suggests that the closest living relative of the Sechuran fox is Darwin's fox, which is native to Chile.

=== Timeline ===
The arrival of the first canid ancestor to South America, and the subsequent divergence into the ten extant canid species (including the Sechuran fox), is an example of remarkably rapid radiation. Details of this recent diversification are not well understood, perhaps the biggest unknown being how many invasive ancestor canid species migrated into South America. However, it is accepted that this occurred during the Great American Biotic Interchange in the Miocene era, via the Panamanian land bridge.

Multiple studies have supported that South American canids (of which the Lycalopex genus makes up over half of these species) are monophyletic, sharing one common ancestor 3.5 million to 4 million years ago. The Sechuran fox was the second out of the six Lycalopex species to diverge from its sister taxon approximately 1.3 million years after the first canid species arrived. The ancestor to the Lycalopex genus is believed to be the Falkland Islands wolf (Dusicyon australis) around 1.4-0.81 million years ago. It is theorized that the main ancestral lineage that migrated from North America split into two, one migrating out east of the Andes, and one going west of the Andes. It is suggested that an ancestral Lycalopex lineage, possibly migrated to the west-Andean region about 1 million years ago, likely during the rise of arid, savannah-like habitats (the sort of habitats that the extant L. sechurae occupies today).

The Pleistocene era was a significant time in the history of this rapid species divergence. It has been suggested in multiple studies that during this period, and into the early Holocene era, there was considerable contraction and expansion of glaciers that resulted in significant shifts in climate of and around the Andes mountains, which was and is still a key driver of speciation. This climate change is believed to have altered habitable areas of some species.

=== Genetics ===
The Sechuran fox's relation to Dusicyon australis has been suggested by a study from Perini et al. (2009). While they were not the first to suspect D. australis as the sister taxa, through their analyses they claim to support this relationship with 87% Bayesian Posterior Probability. The Sechuran fox also appears to have experienced very little gene flow as compared to the other five Lycalopex species. Being only the second species of its genus to diverge from the common ancestor/sister taxa, the Sechuran fox has a high degree of genetic isolation from the other Lycalopex species, as well as a relatively distinct mitochondrial DNA phylogeny.

Additionally, the Sechuran fox's genome exhibits a substantially low degree of autosomal heterozygosity, or genetic variability, especially in contrast with many other South American canids both within and outside of its genus. There is a proposed correlation between low heterozygosity and small population size, which can similarly be seen in Lycalopex fulvipes (or Darwin's fox), which also inhabits a very narrow region west of the Andes, except it includes an island population.

The following phylogenetic tree shows the evolutionary relationships between the Lycalopex species, based on molecular analysis of mitochondrial DNA control region sequences by a study in 2016.

- Lycalopex
  - Hoary fox
  - - Sechuran fox
    - - - Darwin's fox
        - Pampas fox
      - - South American gray fox
        - Culpeo

=== Adaptive characteristics ===
Sechuran fox lacks red fur unlike other species of Lycalopex genus

Within the Lycalopex genus, the Sechuran fox is not strikingly distinct from the other species, though morphological differences are still present. It is the smallest out of all the Lycalopex species and lacks red fur on its body, contrasting with other species in this genus. Certain dental features may be important to note when examining possible adaptations, for example, molar sizes seen in fossils of L. sechurae are longer than the molars seen in more recent specimens.

The versatility of this species has possibly lent itself to its survival. For example, when ecological conditions allow, it is omnivorous, but is capable of surviving on a completely vegetarian diet. It has been suggested that vegetarianism may have influenced the aforementioned decrease in molar size.

It is also thought that the Sechuran fox may have an ability to survive without water for lengthy periods, as suggested by the sparse water availability in its usual habitats. Among mammals, this is not a common ability. A specific duration they can survive without water has not been featured in the literature as of yet, as this requires more studies to confirm.

== Behavior and diet ==
The Sechuran fox is nocturnal, and spends the daylight hours in a den dug into the ground. It is generally solitary, although occasionally seen travelling in pairs. Pups are born in October and November, although little else is known of its reproductive behavior.

The fox is an opportunistic feeder, and its diet varies widely depending on the season and local habitat. It has been found to feed on seed pods, especially those of the shrub Prosopis juliflora and of caper bushes, as well as the fruit of Cordia and mito plants, and is capable of surviving on an entirely herbivorous diet when necessary. More commonly, however, it also eats insects, rodents, bird eggs, and carrion as a part of its diet. It can probably survive for long periods of time without drinking, subsisting on the water in its food. Sechuran fox can disperse as many plant species as other more specialized dispensers, such as phyllostomid bat and white-tailed deer.

Sechuran foxes are common in Ecuador. They have been known to prey on local livestock, such as chickens, and are hunted both to reduce such attacks and so that their body parts can be used in local handicrafts, folk medicine, or magical rituals.

The animal is considered at Low Risk in Ecuador, and hunting is not permitted in Peru without a licence. The species is listed as Near Threatened by the IUCN.
