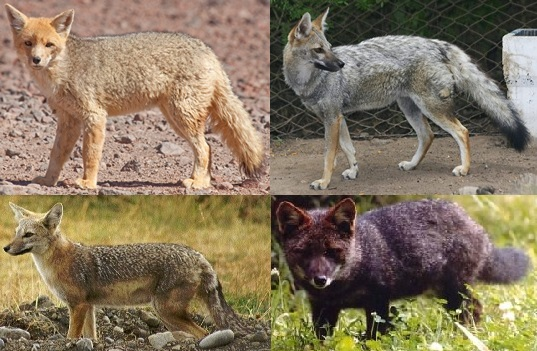

Scientific classification
- Kingdom: Animalia
- Phylum: Chordata
- Class: Mammalia
- Order: Carnivora
- Family: Canidae
- Tribe: Canini
- Subtribe: Cerdocyonina
- Genus: Lycalopex; Burmeister 1854

Type species
- Canis magellanicus

Species
- Lycalopex culpaeus; Lycalopex fulvipes; Lycalopex griseus; Lycalopex gymnocercus; Lycalopex sechurae; Lycalopex vetulus
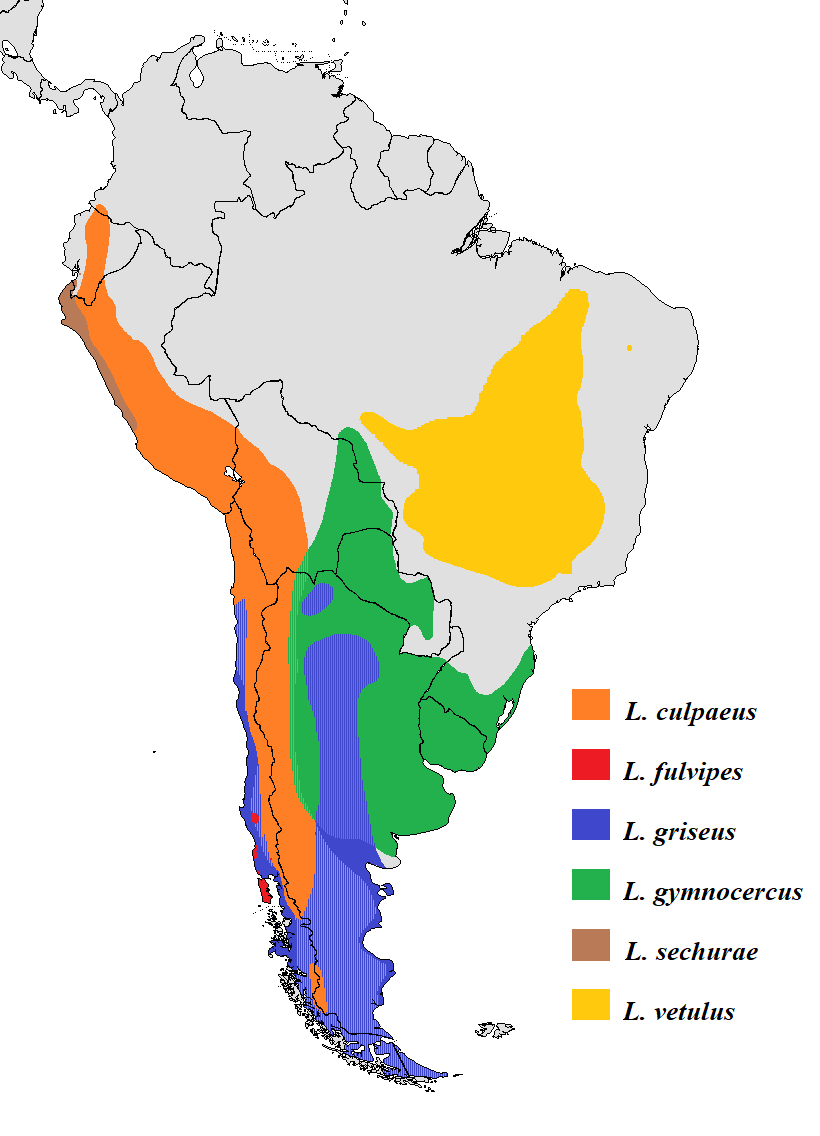
- Range of the six living zorro species

Synonyms
- Pseudalopex Burmeister 1856; Canis (Pseudalopex) Allen 1895

= South American fox =

Lycalopex

Genus of carnivores

The South American foxes (Lycalopex), commonly called raposa in Portuguese, or zorro in Spanish, are a genus inhabiting South America. Despite their name, they are not true foxes, but are a unique canid genus more closely related to wolves and jackals than to true foxes; some of them resemble foxes due to convergent evolution. The South American gray fox, Lycalopex griseus, is the most common species, and is known for its large ears and a highly marketable, russet-fringed pelt.

The second-oldest known fossils belonging to the genus were discovered in Chile, and date from 2.0 to 2.5 million years ago, in the mid- to late Pliocene. The Vorohué Formation of Argentina has provided older fossils, dating to the Uquian to Ensenadan (Late Pliocene).

== Names ==
The common English word "zorro" is a loan word from Spanish, with the word originally meaning "fox". Current usage lists Pseudalopex (literally: "false fox") as synonymous with Lycalopex ("wolf fox"), with the latter taking precedence. In 1895, Allen classified Pseudalopex as a subgenus of Canis, establishing the combination Canis (Pseudalopex), a name still used in the fossil record.

== Species ==
Species currently included in this genus include:

Genus Lycalopex – Burmeister, 1854 – Six species
Common name	Scientific name and subspecies	Range	Size and ecology	IUCN status and estimated population
Culpeo or Andean fox	Lycalopex culpaeus (Molina, 1782)	Ecuador and Peru to the southern regions of Patagonia and Tierra del Fuego	Size: Habitat: Diet:	LC
Darwin's fox	Lycalopex fulvipes (Martin, 1837)	Nahuelbuta National Park (Araucanía Region), the Valdivian Coastal Range (Los Ríos Region) in mainland Chile and Chiloé Island	Size: Habitat: Diet:	EN
South American gray fox or chilla	Lycalopex griseus (Gray, 1837)	Argentina and Chile	Size: Habitat: Diet:	LC
Pampas fox	Lycalopex gymnocercus (G. Fischer, 1814) Six subspecies: L. g. antiquus (Ameghino, 1889); L. g. domeykoanus (Philippi, 1901); L. g. gracilis (Burmeister, 1861); L. g. gymnocercus (G. Fischer, 1814); L. g. lordi (Massoia, 1982); L. g. maullinicus (Philippi, 1903)	northern and central Argentina, Uruguay, eastern Bolivia, Paraguay, and southern Brazil	Size: Habitat: Diet:	LC
Sechuran fox	Lycalopex sechurae Thomas, 1900	west-central, northwestern Peru, including the Sechura Desert, and southwestern Ecuador	Size: Habitat: Diet:	NT
Hoary fox	Lycalopex vetulus (Lund, 1842)	south-central Brazil	Size: Habitat: Diet:	NT

In 1914, Oldfield Thomas established the genus Dusicyon, in which he included these zorros. They were later reclassified to Lycalopex (via Pseudalopex) by Langguth in 1975.

== Phylogeny ==
The following phylogenetic tree shows the evolutionary relationships between the Lycalopex species, based on molecular analysis of mitochondrial DNA control region sequences by a study in 2016.

- Lycalopex
  - Hoary fox
    (Lycalopex vetulus)
  - - Sechuran fox
      (Lycalopex sechurae)
    - - - Darwin's fox
          (Lycalopex fulvipes)
        - Pampas fox
          (Lycalopex gymnocercus)
      - - South American gray fox
          (Lycalopex griseus)
        - Culpeo
          (Lycalopex culpaeus)

A 2005 study based on genome sequence and a comparative analysis and haplotype structure revealed the following cladogram of Lycalopex species.

- Lycalopex
  - - Hoary fox
    - - Darwin's fox
      - - - - Sechuran fox
            - Culpeo
          - - Pampas fox
            - South American gray fox

== Relationship with humans ==
The zorros are hunted in Argentina for their durable, soft pelts. They are also often labelled 'lamb-killers'.

In his diary of his well-known 1952 traveling with the young Che Guevara, Alberto Granado mentions talking with seasonal workers employed on vast sheep farms, who told him of a successful campaign by the ranch owners to exterminate the foxes who were preying on lambs. The ranchers offered a reward of one Argentinian peso for the body of a dead male fox and as much as five pesos for a female fox; to impoverished workers in the early 1950s, five pesos were a significant sum. Within a few years, foxes became virtually extinct in a large part of Argentina.

The Fuegian dog (Spanish: perro yagán, perro fueguino), also known as the Yaghan dog, was a domesticated form of the culpeo (Lycalopex culpaeus), unlike other domesticated canids which were dogs and silver foxes. This means different canid species have been domesticated multiple times by humans independently.
