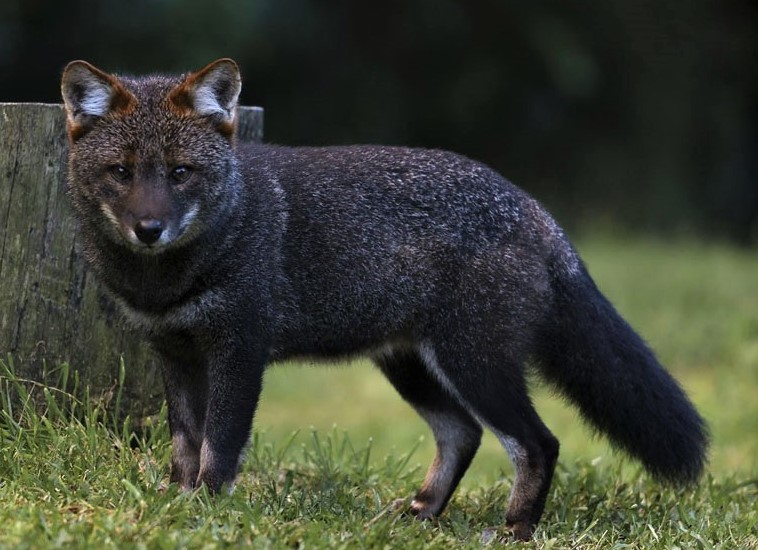

Conservation status
- Endangered (IUCN 3.1)
- CITES Appendix II

Scientific classification
- Kingdom: Animalia
- Phylum: Chordata
- Class: Mammalia
- Order: Carnivora
- Family: Canidae
- Genus: Lycalopex
- Species: L. fulvipes

Binomial name
- Lycalopex fulvipes (Martin, 1837)
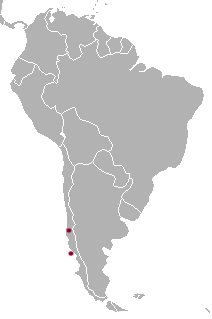
- Darwin's fox range

= Darwin's fox =

Species of canid

Darwin's fox or Darwin's zorro (Lycalopex fulvipes) is an endangered canid from the genus Lycalopex, which is distantly related to wolves and whose members are not true foxes. It is also known as the zorro chilote or zorro de Darwin in Spanish and is endemic to Chile, where it lives in the temperate rainforests of Nahuelbuta National Park, the Cordillera de Oncol, Cordillera Pelada, and Chiloé Island. It is a small, dark-colored species that is distinguished from other Lycalopex by its shorter legs, broader head, and darker pelage.

Darwin's fox was first collected from San Pedro Island off the coast of Chile by the naturalist Charles Darwin in 1834, after whom the species is named. It was long held that Darwin's fox was a subspecies of the South American gray fox (Lycalopex griseus); however, in 1990, a small population of Darwin's fox was discovered on the mainland in Nahuelbuta National Park and subsequent genetic analysis confirmed that the fox is a distinct species.

The species is thought to number under 1,000 mature individuals, with most found on Chiloé Island and smaller populations on the mainland. Once considered Critically Endangered, it was reclassified as Endangered in 2016. Its main threats come from domestic and feral dogs, which spread diseases and attack foxes, along with human disturbance and ongoing habitat loss from agriculture and forestry activity. Conservation efforts focus on managing disease risk through vaccination and establish protected area. Future conservation strategies may involve using genetic tools.

== Description ==
Darwin's Fox is a small, dark canine weighing 1.8 to 3.95 kg (4.0 to 8.7 lb), has a head-and-body length of 48 to 59 cm (19 to 23 in) and a tail that is 17.5 to 25.5 cm (7 to 10 in). There are no major external differences between male and female apart from the broader muzzle observed in males.

The species is restricted to forest habitats and does not interbreed with the other Lycalopex species. It is smaller and darker-colored than other members of the genus and shows several distinguishing morphological traits.

Compared to the South American gray fox, the Darwin's fox has shorter legs, a broader and shorter skull, smaller auditory bullae, more robust dentition, with differences in jaw shape and premolar occlusion. Its pelage is mottled, consisting of black and gray fur with reddish tones on the ears and lower legs. White markings are found under the chin, along the lower mandible, on the underbelly, and inner portions of the legs. The short, bushy, dark gray tail is a diagnostic characteristic used to distinguish from other related species.

== Taxonomy and evolution ==
=== Initial Discovery and Naming ===
Lycalopex is a South American genus of canine, which is distantly related to wolves and is technically not a fox. One of the first descriptions of Darwin’s fox came from Charles Darwin during a stop at San Pedro Island in Chiloé Archipelago during the Beagle survey expedition in December 1834. In his journal he wrote that he killed one with a geological hammer while it was watching his group conduct survey work. In 1839, Darwin reported in his Journal and Remarks that this specimen was mounted in the Museum of Zoological Society (Zoological Society of London). He described Darwin’s fox as an undescribed species that was more curious but less wise than other foxes, indicating that it was distinct from species that occur on the mainland.

Darwin’s fox was originally given the name Vulpes fulvipes by William Charles Linnaeus Martin in 1837. In 1943, there was some disagreement on if the Darwin's Fox was a subspecies of South American gray fox (at the time Dusicyon griseus, now Lycalopex griseus). Ultimately, Wilfred H. Osgood's morphological observations along with the fact that Darwin's fox populations were isolated from mainland foxes contributed its classification as a separate species, Dusicyon fulvipes. However, in 1969, Alfredo Langguth's work had presented evidence that would have the Darwin’s fox reclassified as a subspecies of South American gray fox (at the time Pseudalopex griseus, now Lycalopex griseus). In 1996, mitochondrial DNA sequencing distinguished Darwin's fox from the South American gray fox and causing it to be reconsidered its own separate species, Pseudalopex fulvipes. In 1995, it was suggested that Pseudalopex and Lycalopex should be clustered into a single monophyletic group and by 2005, all South American foxes were grouped into genus Lycalopex, thus the Darwin's fox current scientific name is Lycalopex fulvipes.

=== Mainland Population Discovery ===
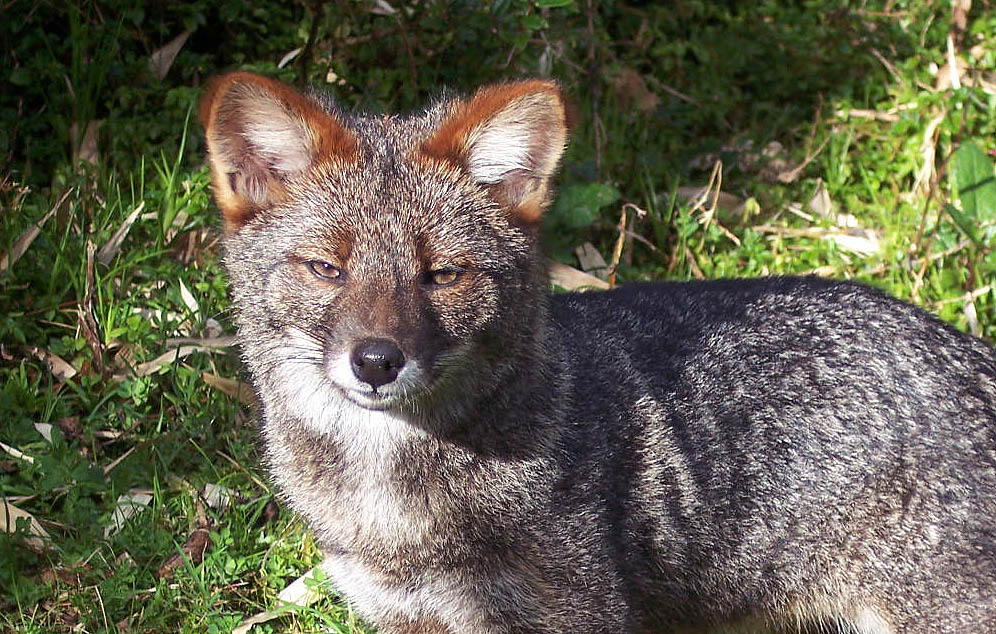
A male in Ahuenco, Chiloé Island, Chile

Until the discovery of a small mainland population in Nahuelbuta National Park in 1990, it was thought that Darwin’s fox was endemic to Chiloé Island. It was theorized that during the late Pleistocene, Chiloé Island was connected to mainland Chile by a land bridge which was severed about 15,000 years ago, leading to the two isolated populations of Darwin’s fox. Mitochondrial DNA analysis of several South American foxes suggested Darwin's fox is a distinct species that originated in the Late Pleistocene, when an invasion of foxes occurred in South America. It was also found that the DNA of mainland and Chiloé island populations of Darwin's foxes only differ by 2%. Since there has been no record animals being released from Chiloé island to the mainland, it is believed that the existence of a mainland Darwin's fox population can be explained as a remnant of a more widely spread species from the Late Pleistocene fox invasion into South America.

=== Phylogeny ===
The following phylogenetic tree shows the evolutionary relationships between the Lycalopex species, based on molecular analysis of mitochondrial DNA control region sequences from a study in 2016.

- Lycalopex
  - Hoary fox
  - - Sechuran fox
    - - - Darwin's fox
        - Pampas fox
      - - South American gray fox
        - Culpeo

== Diet ==
Darwin's fox is an opportunistic omnivore and has a varied diet. In general, most of its diet is believed to come from insects, however, it also feeds on small mammals, birds, reptiles, fruits and seeds.

Scat analysis of Darwin's fox populations in Nahuelbuta National Park consisted mostly of mammals, including Akodon, Monito del monte, Southern big-eared mouse, and long-clawed mole mouse, although it also contained birds, reptiles, insects, arachnids, and plants. Scat analysis of populations on Chiloé Island consisted mostly of invertebrates, especially arthropods and Cratomelus armatus, rodents, and fruits, but also contained fish, reptiles, birds, and Monito del monte. Intake of specific dietary items varies seasonably in this population, with a greater intake of rodents and lesser intake of invertebrates in winter.

== Ecology ==
=== Habitat and Behaviour ===
Darwin's fox inhabits temperate rainforest ecosystems of southern Chile. The species occurs in distinct habitats from other Chilean canines, such as South American gray foxes and Culpeos. On Chiloé Island and the mainland, habitat use includes primary and second-growth forest and shrubland, with occasional use of coastal dune systems. In the Valdivian Coastal Range, the species has been recorded in old-growth and secondary evergreen forests as well as unmanaged eucalyptus plantations. Radio-telemetry research further indicates use of Araucaria–Nothofagus forest, evergreen forest, and, less frequently, open pasture habitats. Occupancy increases in areas with greater native forest cover and declines where road density is higher. Home ranges vary between approximately 103 and 488 hectares, with substantial overlap among individuals, and males display no territorial behavior and are not aggressive towards other males roaming within these areas.

Field studies in Nahuelbuta have documented individuals occurring in areas characterized by dense native forest vegetation. In 2012 and 2013, the presence of the Darwin's fox at Oncol Park, Alerce Costero National Park and the Valdivian Coastal Reserve was confirmed through camera trapping. Results also showed that Darwin's fox populations exist both inside the Nahuelbuta National Park and in the surrounding region up to 30 km north and northwest of its borders.

They are most active at twilight and before sunrise. Some reports from locals suggest that Darwin's foxes do not have a fear of humans and are easy to tame. Current evidence suggests that human perturbation has a negative effect on Darwin’s foxes. On Chiloé Island, Darwin’s foxes were detected less often in areas with lower forest cover or higher dog activity. Although the species is protected in Nahuelbuta National Park, substantial mortality sources exist when foxes move to lower, unprotected private areas in search of milder conditions during the winter.

=== Population ===
Status surveys reported that past populations on Chiloé Island had a stable size of 250 individuals in protected areas and a decreasing population of 250 individuals in other areas of Chile. While the mainland contained about 78 individuals in protected areas and a decreasing population of 10 individuals in other areas. In a 2012 annual report by The Mohamed bin Zayed Species Conservation Fund, the total population is less than 250 mature individuals with at least 90% of the population occurring in one subpopulation on Chiloé Island. The population was once considered as Critically Endangered because its main population occurred in one island and their habitat was declining due to human impact. However, a 2016 IUCN assessment estimated a minimum of 412 mature individuals on Chiloé Island and 227 mature individuals in mainland areas, for a total of approximately 639 mature individuals, updating its status as Endangered.

== Conservation status ==
In 2016, the IUCN classified Darwin's fox as Endangered. Current estimates of the total population are low and protecting the species remains challenging due to multiple threats.

=== Protection against Domestic Dogs ===
One of the major threats is domestic dogs. In both mainland regions and Chiloé Island, attacks by domestic dogs have been documented as a source of mortality for Darwin’s foxes. Supporting this, researchers also found that foxes tend to avoid areas occupied by dogs, including forests that dogs frequently visit. In addition to attacks, the risk of disease spillover from dogs is also a major threat, with the spread of diseases like canine distemper to Darwin’s foxes being a particular concern as there is historical precedent of the disease causing population decline in the Island Fox. To prevent disease transmission, free vaccines are provided for domestic dogs by a group of scientists in Chile in an effort to prevent spillover between populations.

=== Habitat Loss and Protected Habitats ===
The loss of habitat is an important threat as Darwin's fox prefers to inhabit forested areas, although they have been sited on plantations as well. The highest rates of forest loss are recorded in the coastal range of the Araucanía Region, where the annual forest loss rate reached 4.8% between 1999-2008. This was the second highest forest loss rate reported for Chilean temperate forest. Consequently, habitat loss reduces the total area available for Darwin’s fox and may favour fox species that prefer open areas. However, the effects of land cover changes on local interaction webs are unknown. In 2025, researchers are using species distribution modelling to predict potential habitat and ecological corridors of Darwin's fox. The study aims to understand where Darwin’s fox is most likely to occur in southern Chile, including areas where populations may not yet have been detected. The study allows the researchers to produce a map of potential habitat suitability, and provide scientific evidence for conservation planning. Potentially, researchers can design ecological corridors to improve connectivity among isolated populations.

Darwin’s fox has been recorded in the following public protected areas: Alerce Costero National Park (Los Ríos Administrative Region), Nahuelbuta National Park (Araucanía Administrative Region), and Chiloé National Park (Los Lagos Administrative Region). It has also been recorded in the following private protected areas: Caramávida Reserve (Biobío Administrative Region), Oncol Park and Valdivian Coastal Reserve (Los Ríos Administrative Region), and Tantauco, Ahuenco and Tepuhueico Parks (Los Lagos Administrative Region).

=== Human Interactions ===
Darwin's Fox is vulnerable to human-caused mortality. In Chiloé, reports from local communities indicate that Darwin's fox is killed due to its perceived threat to domestic animals. In addition, there have been documented cases of foxes being caught in traps and relocated after poultry predation. In Oncol Park, Alerce Costero National Park, and Valdivian Coastal Reserve, there have been reports of some species of foxes being killed as a response to predation on poultry, however, it is unknown if Darwin's fox is part of this population. Furthermore, construction of bridges, highways and roads between Chiloé island and the mainland is considered an indirect threat to foxes. In the absence of barriers, the bridge could facilitate the dispersal of non-native species to the island, such as closely related fox species and pumas (Puma concolor). The consequences require further investigation.

The only known captive population is maintained by Fauna Adina near Villarrica, Chile, where the species has successfully reproduced. In September 2023, a Plan for the Recovery, Conservation and Management (Spanish acronym RECOGE) for Darwin's fox was submitted to the Chilean Ministry of Environment with its focus being addressing major knowledge gaps to better implement conservation efforts for the species. In 2025, the Darwin's fox was added to the RECOGE plan, allowing greater protections for the species and its habitats.

=== Conservation using Molecular Technology ===
Future conservation efforts for Darwin's fox is expected to integrate genomic technologies with traditional conservation strategies. High-throughput sequencing (HTS) has been proposed as a method to address the knowledge gap on remaining genetic diversity and pathogen exposure of Darwin's fox. Some believe that this molecular data will be essential for developing effective conservation management plans. However, in South America, the application of HTS in conservation research is limited, mainly due to funding shortages, the availability of advanced genomic equipment, and access to analytical expertise.

== Diseases ==
Disease spread from rural, domestic dogs is considered a threat in Darwin's fox populations. Rural dogs often roam free in Chile and are not provided with any veterinary care. Interactions with these dogs is thought to lead to pathogen transmission. A 2022 study determined dietary overlap in rural dogs and Darwin's foxes despite differences in habitat use by analyzing carbon and nitrogen isotopes in hair samples, concluding shared food resources in human-modified landscapes can be detrimental to the Darwin's fox due to pathogen spillover. Viruses canine distemper and rabies are believed to be able to spread to Darwin's foxes from rural dogs, however, there is little evidence of either disease being present in Darwin's fox populations. Due to the lack of intraspecies interaction, Darwin's fox has limited pathogen spillover from members of its own species but also limited acquired immunity. Because of this, some researchers believe they may be particularly vulnerable to epidemics.

Darwin's foxes are plagued by the Mycoplasma bacterium although it does not cause obvious symptoms. While it is known that the Mycoplasma haemocanis can transmit through brown dog ticks and attach themselves to the surface of red blood cells of many mammals, including humans, dogs, and cats, the specific mode of transmission in the Darwin's fox is unknown as Chiloé island is not known to harbour any canine ticks. Despite this, screening for the Mycoplasma characteristic 16S rRNA gene showed M. haemocanis prevalence is higher in Darwin's foxes than rural dogs and risk of contracting M. haemocanis inclines with age. In 2013, Mycoplasma haemofelis was detected in Darwin's fox populations, marking the first time a feline hemoplasmic pathogen had been detected in a canid. There is no clear geographical relationship for Mycoplasma prevalence in Darwin's fox populations and it is largely unknown how it affects the species.

There is also evidence of Toxoplasma gondii and Leptospira in Darwin's fox populations which may pose a threat to the species. Specifically, T. gondii was widespread in Darwin's fox populations that were living in non-anthropized areas. T. gondii exposure in Darwin's fox has no correlation with specific risk factors such as sex, age, season, or degree of anthropization. Darwin's foxes were reported to have one of the highest prevalence of T. gondii antibodies in Chilean wildlife and foxes worldwide, potentially a sign of frequent infections.
