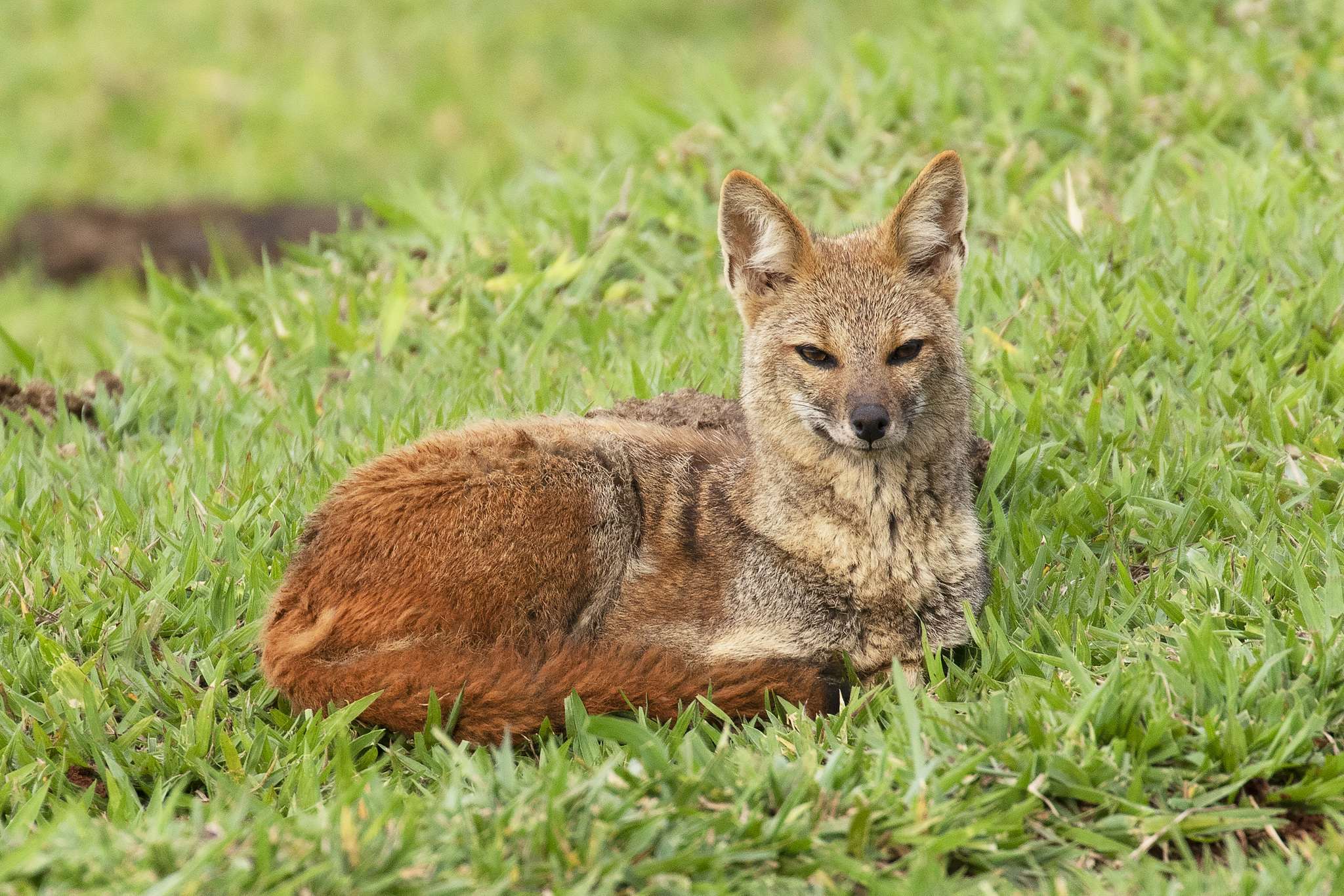

Conservation status
- Near Threatened (IUCN 3.1)

Scientific classification
- Kingdom: Animalia
- Phylum: Chordata
- Class: Mammalia
- Order: Carnivora
- Family: Canidae
- Genus: Lycalopex
- Species: L. vetulus

Binomial name
- Lycalopex vetulus (Lund, 1842)
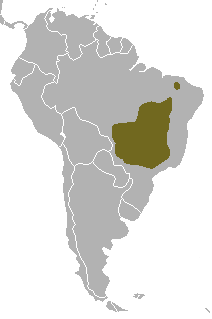
- Hoary fox range

Synonyms
- Pseudoalopex vetulus Dusicyon vetulus

= Hoary fox =

Species of carnivore

The hoary fox or hoary zorro (Lycalopex vetulus), also known as raposinha-do-campo in Brazil (Portuguese for "little fox of the meadow"), is a species of zorro or "false" fox endemic to Brazil. Unlike many other foxes, it feeds primarily on small invertebrates such as insects.

== Description ==
The hoary fox has a short muzzle, small teeth, a short coat, and slender limbs. The upper part of the body is grey, and the underside of the body is cream or fawn. The tail is black on the tip with a marked dark stripe along the upper surface, which in male animals may extend all the way along the back to the nape of the neck. The ears and outside part of the legs are reddish or tawny, and the lower jaw is black. Some melanistic individuals have also been reported.

It is small for a fox, weighing only 3 to 4 kg (6.6 to 8.8 lb), with a head and body length of 58 to 72 cm (23 to 28 in), and a tail 25 to 36 cm (9.8 to 14.2 in). Together with its slender form, the small size of the hoary fox makes it an agile and fast-running animal, while its relatively weak teeth adapt it to feeding on invertebrates, rather than larger prey.

The following phylogenetic tree shows the evolutionary relationships between the Lycalopex species, based on molecular analysis of mitochondrial DNA control region sequences by a study in 2016.

- Lycalopex
  - Hoary fox
  - - Sechuran fox
    - - - Darwin's fox
        - Pampas fox
      - - South American gray fox
        - Culpeo

== Behaviour and diet ==
Hoary foxes are nocturnal, and largely solitary outside of the breeding season. They mainly eat insects, especially termites, dung beetles, and grasshoppers, but also may eat rodents, small birds, and fruit. Individuals have widely varying home ranges, depending on the local environment and reported examples are as follows: 385 ha (950 acres) for 1 adult female in southern Bahia, 456 ha (1,130 acres) for a group consisting of an adult breeding pair and 5 juvenile offspring in a pasture of Minas Gerais, and 48 ha (120 acres) for 2 breeding pairs out of 3 study groups from pastures in eastern Mato Grosso.

== Range ==
The hoary fox is endemic to Brazil and its geographic distribution is associated with the limits of the Cerrado ecosystem, in an altitude range of 90–1,100 m. However, it can also be found in transition zones, including open habitats in the Pantanal. The occurrence of the hoary fox in areas of the Atlantic Forest is in a matrix of anthropogenic pastures, regionally interspersed by remnants of semideciduous forest and small patches of Cerrado.

The current extension extends from the northeast and west of São Paulo to the north of Piauí, passing through the states of Ceará, Mato Grosso do Sul, Mato Grosso, Goiás, Distrito Federal, Minas Gerais, Tocantins, Bahia and probably open regions in the south of the states of Rondônia.

== Reproduction ==
Females usually give birth to two to four pups in August to September, after a gestation period around 50 days. The sex ratio of the pups is equal between males and females. The female prepares a den in which to give birth, sometimes using the burrows of other animals. Weaning occurs around 4 months of age. Both parents participate in rearing of the pups.
