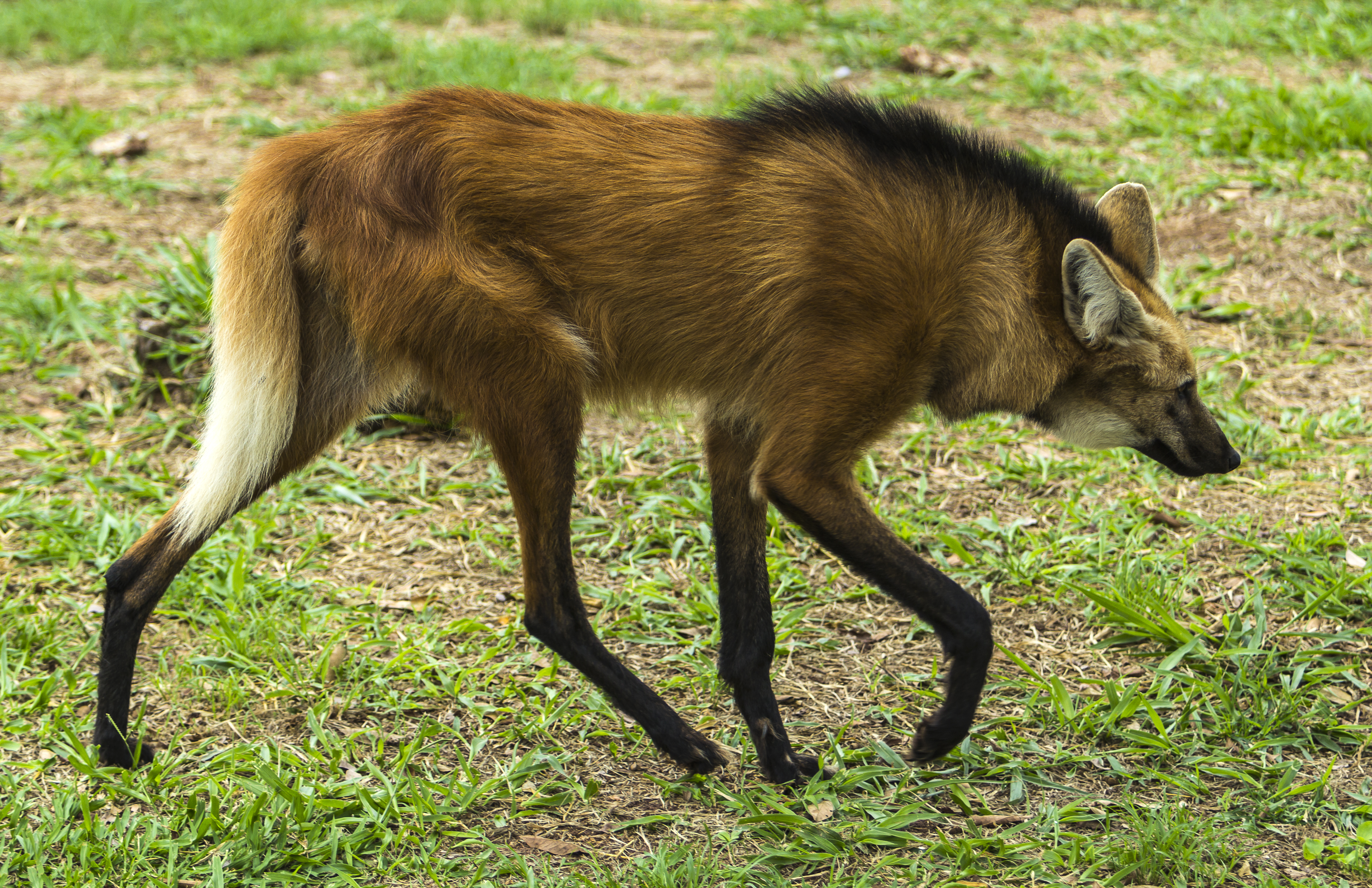
- In the Serra da Canastra, Minas Gerais, Brazil.

Conservation status
- Near Threatened (IUCN 3.1)
- CITES Appendix II

Scientific classification
- Kingdom: Animalia
- Phylum: Chordata
- Class: Mammalia
- Order: Carnivora
- Family: Canidae
- Tribe: Canini
- Subtribe: Cerdocyonina
- Genus: Chrysocyon; Smith, 1839
- Species: C. brachyurus

Binomial name
- Chrysocyon brachyurus (Illiger, 1815)
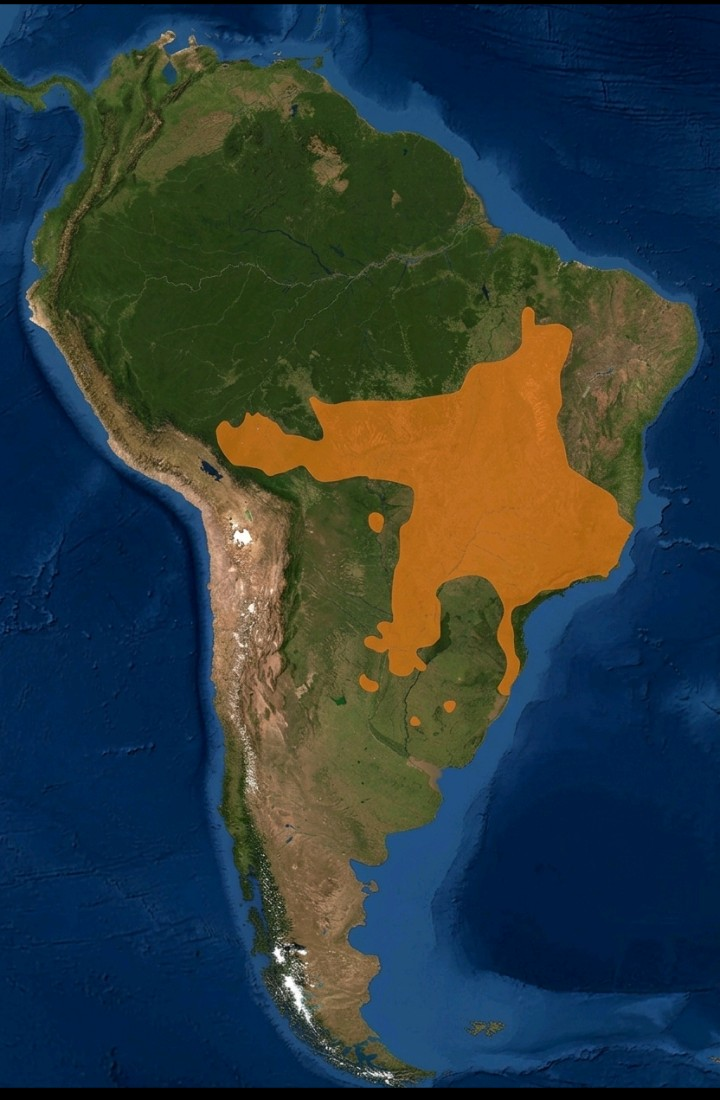
- Range

Synonyms
- Canis brachyurus; C. campestris; C. isodactylus; C. jubatus; Vulpes cancrosa

= Maned wolf =

Maned wolf Temporal range: Late Pleistocene – Present

Species of carnivore

The maned wolf (Chrysocyon brachyurus) is a large canine of South America. It is found in Argentina, Brazil, Bolivia, Peru, and Paraguay, and is almost locally extinct in Uruguay. Its markings resemble those of a red fox but it is neither a fox nor a wolf. It is the only species in the genus Chrysocyon (from Greek χρῡσο-κύων [chrúso-kúōn], "golden dog"). The maned wolf's young pups appear to have darker fur than the bronze, grown ones.

It is the largest canine in South America, weighing 20–30 kg (44–66 lb) and up to 110 cm (43 in) at the withers. Its slender legs and dense reddish coat give it a distinctive appearance. The maned wolf is a crepuscular and omnivorous animal adapted to the open environments of the South American savanna, with an important role in the seed dispersal of fruits, especially the wolf apple (Solanum lycocarpum). The maned wolf is a solitary animal. It communicates primarily by scent marking, but also gives a loud call known as "roar-barking".

This mammal lives in open and semi-open habitats, especially grasslands with scattered bushes and trees, in the Cerrado of south, central-west, and southeastern Brazil, Paraguay, northern Argentina, and Bolivia east and north of the Andes, and far southeastern Peru (Pampas del Heath only). It is very rare in Uruguay, possibly being displaced completely through loss of habitat. The International Union for Conservation of Nature lists it as near threatened, while it is considered a vulnerable species by the Brazilian Institute of Environment and Renewable Natural Resources. In 2011, a female maned wolf, run over by a truck, underwent stem cell treatment at the Zoo Brasília in the first recorded case of the use of stem cells to heal injuries in a wild animal.

== Etymology ==
The term maned wolf is an allusion to the mane of the nape. It is known locally as aguara guasu (meaning "large fox") in the Guarani language, or kalak in the Toba Qom language, lobo-guará in Portuguese, and lobo de crín, lobo de los esteros, aguará guazú, or lobo colorado in Spanish. The term lobo, "wolf", originates from the Latin lupus. Guará and aguará originated from Tupi-Guarani agoa'rá, "by the fuzz". It also is called borochi in Bolivia.

== Taxonomy ==
Although the maned wolf displays many fox-like characteristics, it is not closely related to foxes. It lacks the almond-shaped pupils found distinctively in foxes. The maned wolf's evolutionary relationship to the other members of the canid family makes it a unique animal.

Electrophoretic studies did not link Chrysocyon with any of the other living canids studied. One conclusion of this study is that the maned wolf is the only species among the large South American canids that survived the late Pleistocene extinction. Fossils of the maned wolf from the Holocene and the late Pleistocene have been excavated from the Brazilian Highlands.

A 2003 study on the brain anatomy of several canids placed the maned wolf together with the Falkland Islands wolf and with pseudo-foxes of the genus Pseudalopex. One study based on DNA evidence showed that the extinct genus Dusicyon, comprising the Falkland Islands wolf and its mainland relative, was the most closely related species to the maned wolf in historical times, and that about seven million years ago it shared a common ancestor with that genus. A 2015 study reported genetic signatures in maned wolves that are indicative of population expansion followed by contraction that took place during Pleistocene interglaciations about 24,000 years before present.

The maned wolf is not closely related to canids found outside South America. It is not a fox, wolf, coyote, or jackal, but a distinct canid; though, based only on morphological similarities, it previously had been placed in the Canis and Vulpes genera. Its closest living relative is the bush dog (genus Speothos), and it has a more distant relationship to other South American canines (the short-eared dog, the crab-eating fox, and the South American foxes).

- Cerdocyonina
  - - Speothos venaticus (bush dog)
    - - Chrysocyon brachyurus (maned wolf)
      - †Dusicyon australis (Falkland Islands wolf)
  - - - - Lycalopex
          - Lycalopex vetulus (hoary fox)
          - - Lycalopex fulvipes (Darwin's fox)
            - - - Lycalopex griseus (South American gray fox or chilla)
                - Lycalopex gymnocercus (pampas fox)
              - - Lycalopex culpaeus (culpeo or Andean fox)
                - Lycalopex sechurae (Sechuran fox or Peruvian desert fox)
        - Cerdocyon thous (crab-eating fox)
      - Atelocynus microtis (short-eared dog)

== Description ==
Video of captive maned wolf at Singapore Zoo

The species was described in 1815 by Johann Karl Wilhelm Illiger, initially as Canis brachyurus. Lorenz Oken classified it as Vulpes cancosa, and only in 1839 did Charles Hamilton Smith describe the genus Chrysocyon. Other authors later considered it as a member of the Canis genus. Fossils of Chrysocyon dated from the Late Pleistocene and Holocene epochs were collected in one of Peter Wilhelm Lund expeditions to Lagoa Santa, Minas Gerais (Brazil). The specimen is kept in the South American Collection of the Zoologisk Museum in Denmark. Since no other record exists of fossils in other areas, the species is suggested to have evolved in this geographic region.

The maned wolf bears minor similarities to the red fox, although it belongs to a different genus and is considerably larger and differently built. The average adult weighs 23 kg (51 lb) and stands up to 110 cm (43 in) tall at the shoulder, and has a head-body length of 100 cm (39 in), with the tail adding another 45 cm (18 in). Its ears are large and long 18 cm (7.1 in).

The maned wolf is the tallest of the wild canids; its long legs are probably an adaptation to the tall grasslands of its native habitat. Fur of the maned wolf may be reddish-brown to golden orange on the sides with long, black legs and a distinctive black mane. The coat is marked further with a whitish tuft at the tip of the tail and a white "bib" beneath the throat. The mane is erectile and typically is used to enlarge the wolf's profile when threatened or when displaying aggression. Melanistic maned wolves do exist, but are rare. The first photograph of a black adult maned wolf was taken by a camera trap in northern Minas Gerais in Brazil in 2013.

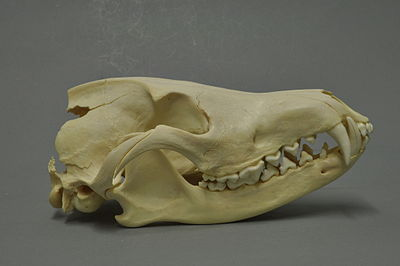
The skull

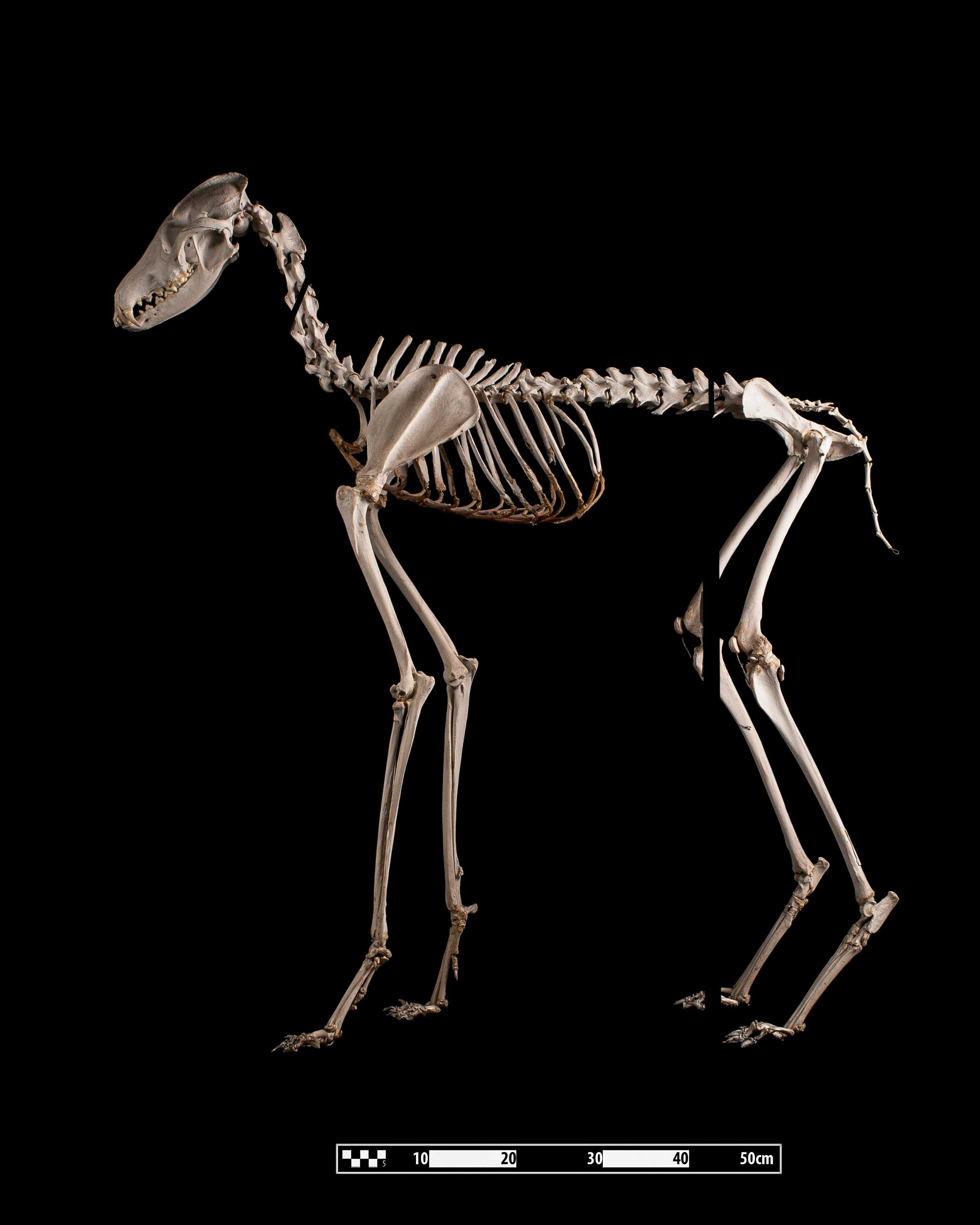
The skeleton

The skull can be identified by its reduced carnassials, small upper incisors, and long canine teeth. Like other canids, it has 42 teeth with the dental formula 3.1.4.23.1.4.3 × 2 = 42. The maned wolf's rhinarium extends to the upper lip, similar to the bush dog, but its vibrissae are longer. The skull also features a prominent sagittal crest.

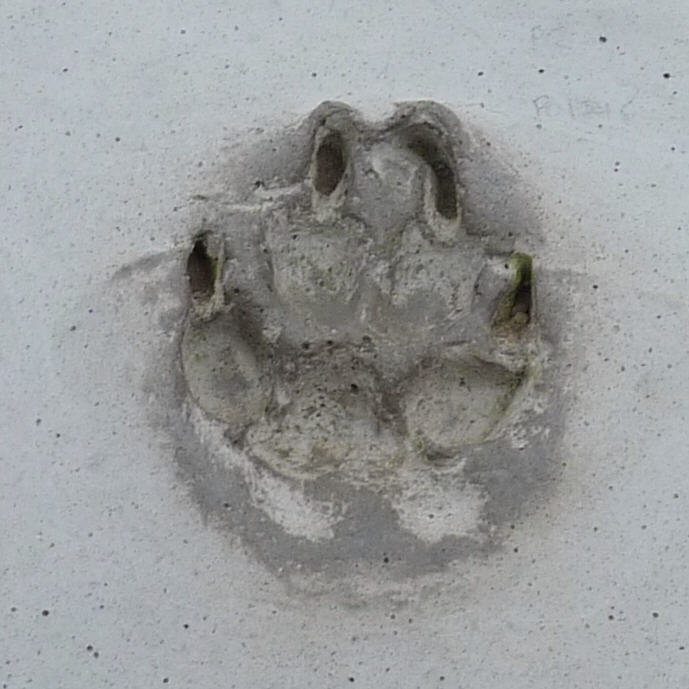
The footprint

The maned wolf's footprints are similar to those of the dog, but have disproportionately small plantar pads when compared to the well-opened digit marks. The dog has pads up to three times larger than the maned wolf's footprint. These pillows have a triangular shape. The front footprints are 7–9 cm (2.8–3.5 in) long and 5.5–7 cm (2.2–2.8 in) wide, and those of the hind feet are 6.5–9 cm (2.6–3.5 in) long and 6.5–8.5 cm (2.6–3.3 in) wide. One feature that differentiates the maned wolf's footprint from those of other South American canids is the proximal union of the third and fourth digits.

The maned wolf also is known for the distinctive cannabis-like odor of its territory markings, which has earned it the nickname "skunk wolf".

=== Genetics ===
Genetically, the maned wolf has 37 pairs of autosomes within diploid genes, with a karyotype similar to that of other canids. It has 76 chromosomes, so cannot interbreed with other canids. Evidence suggests that 15,000 years ago, the species suffered a reduction in its genetic diversity, called the bottleneck effect. However, its diversity is still greater than that of other canids.

== Ecology and behavior ==
=== Hunting and territoriality ===
The maned wolf is a twilight animal, but its activity pattern is more related to the relative humidity and temperature, similar to that observed with the bush dog (Speothos venaticus). Peak activity occurs between 8 and 10 am, and 8 and 10 pm. On cold or cloudy days, they can be active all day. The species is likely to use open fields for foraging and more closed areas, such as riparian forests, to rest, especially on warmer days.

Unlike most large canids (such as the gray wolf, the African hunting dog, or the dhole), the maned wolf is a solitary animal and does not form packs. It typically hunts alone, usually between sundown and midnight, rotating its large ears to listen for prey animals in the grass. It taps the ground with a front foot to flush out the prey and pounce to catch it. It kills prey by biting on the neck or back, and shaking the prey violently if necessary.

Monogamous pairs may defend a shared territory around 30 km^{2} (12 sq mi), although outside of mating, the individuals may meet only rarely. The territory is crisscrossed by paths that they create as they patrol at night. Several adults may congregate in the presence of a plentiful food source, for example, a fire-cleared patch of grassland that would leave small vertebrate prey exposed while foraging.

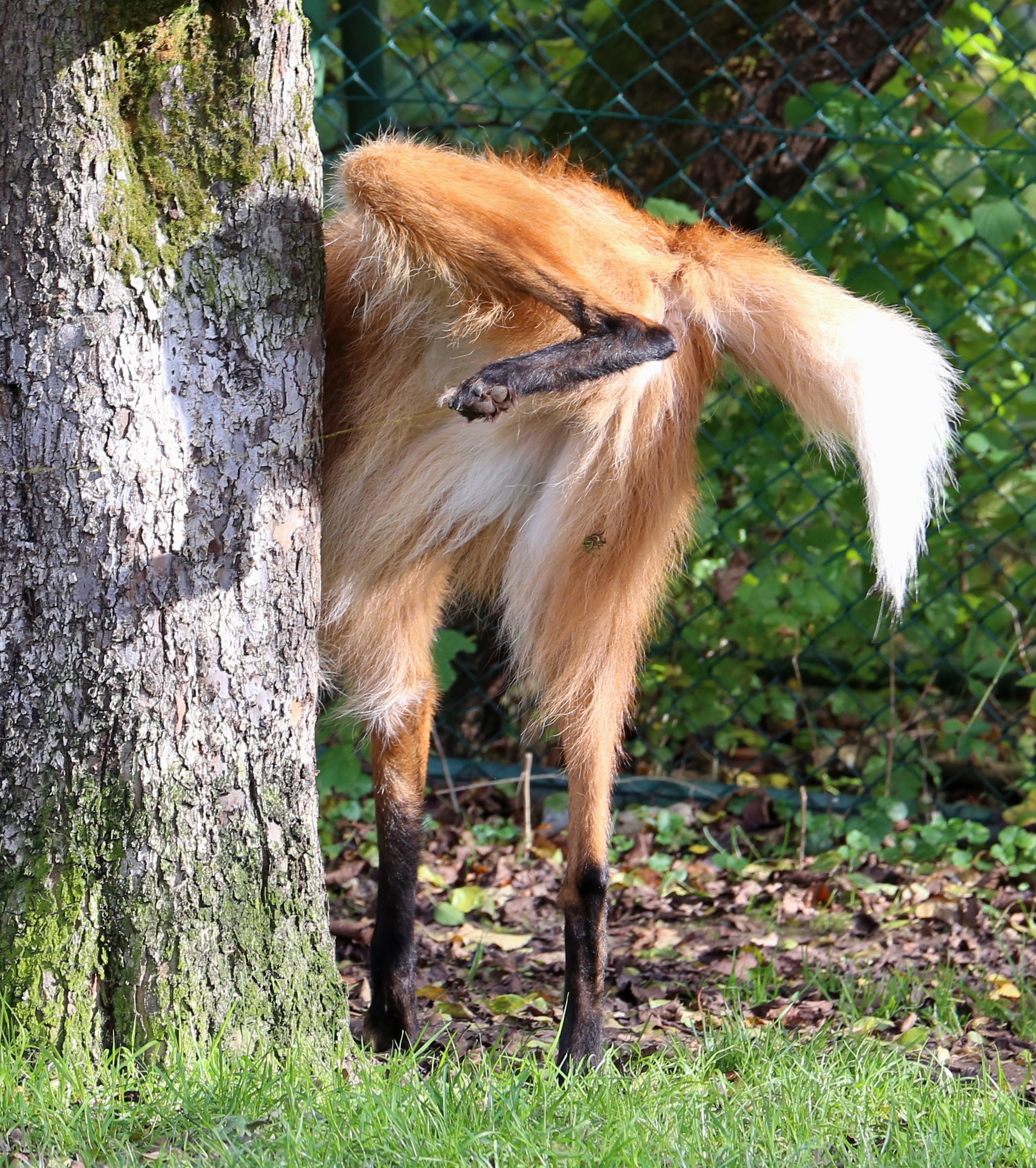
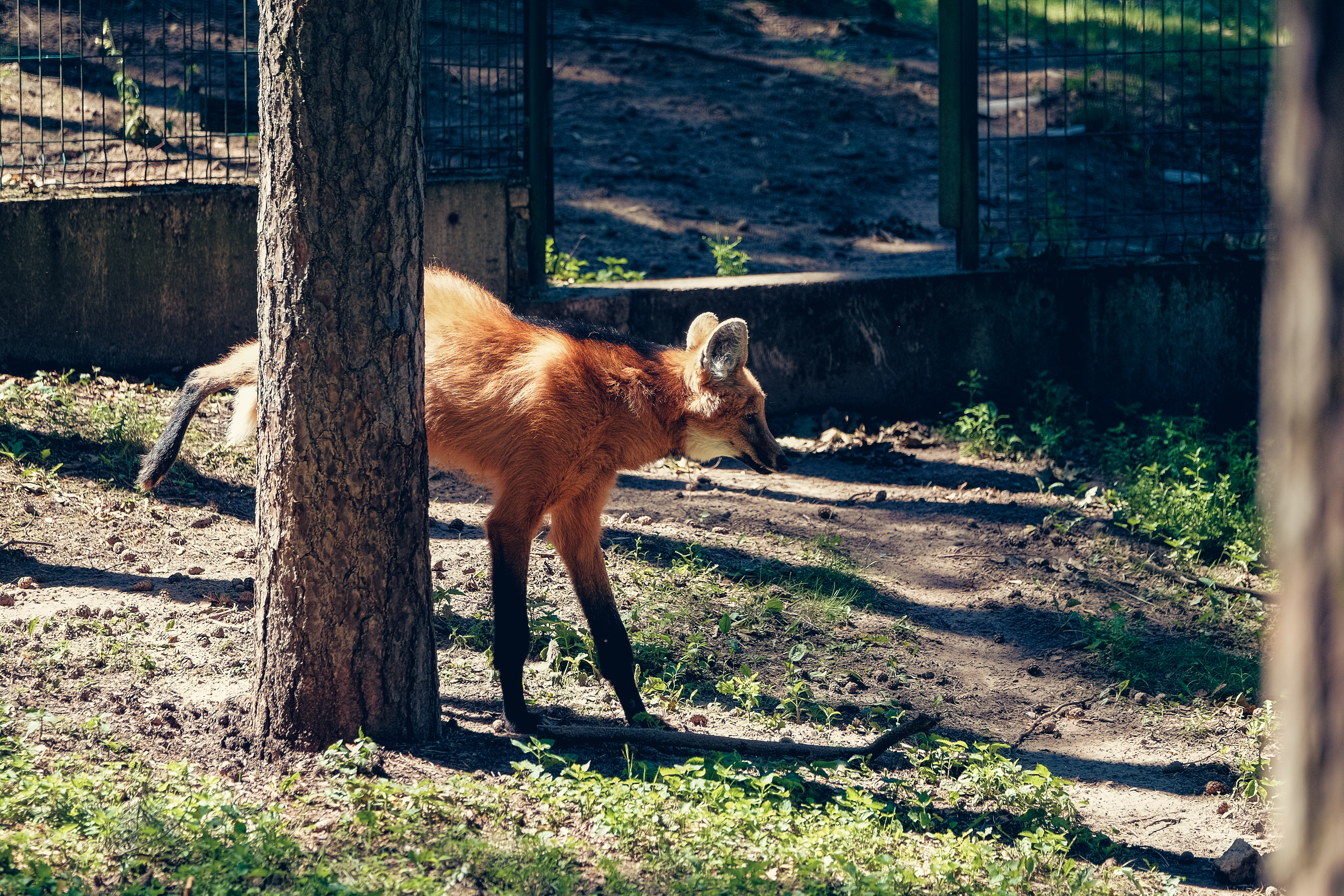
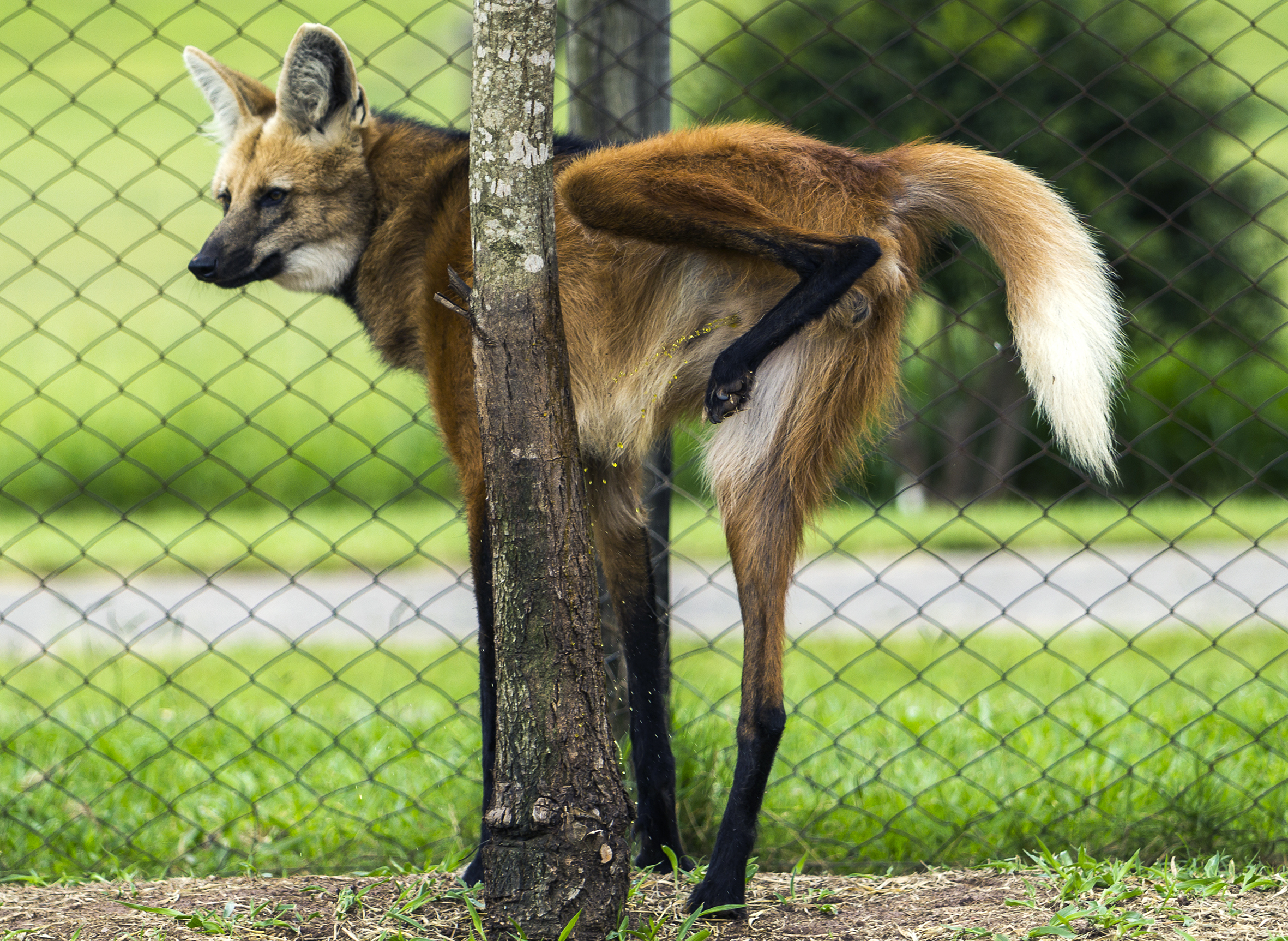
Maned wolves mark their territories with urine.

Both female and male maned wolves use their urine to communicate, e.g. to mark their hunting paths or the places where they have buried hunted prey. The urine has a very distinctive odor, which some people liken to hops or cannabis. The responsible substance very likely is a pyrazine, which also occurs in both plants. At the Rotterdam Zoo, this smell once set the police on a hunt for cannabis smokers. The preferred habitat of the maned wolf includes grasslands, scrub prairies, and forests.

=== Reproduction and life cycle ===
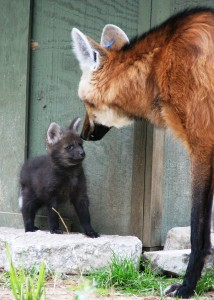
A maned wolf and pup at White Oak Conservation

Their mating season ranges from November to April. Gestation lasts 60 to 65 days, and a litter may have from two to six black-furred pups, each weighing roughly 450 g (16 oz). Pups are fully grown when one year old. During that first year, the pups rely on their parents for food.

Data on the maned wolf's estrus and reproductive cycle mainly come from captive animals, particularly about breeding endocrinology. Hormonal changes of maned wolves in the wild follow the same variation pattern of those in captivity. Females ovulate spontaneously, but some authors suggest that the presence of a male is important for estrus induction.

Captive animals in the Northern Hemisphere breed between October and February and in the Southern Hemisphere between August and October. This indicates that photoperiod plays an important role in maned wolf reproduction, mainly due to the production of semen. Generally, one estrus occurs per year. The amount of sperm produced by the maned wolf is lower compared to those of other canids.

Copulation occurs during the four-day estrus period, and lasts up to 15 minutes. Courtship is similar to that of other canids, characterized by frequent approaches and anogenital investigation.

Gestation lasts 60 to 65 days and a litter may have from two to six pups. One litter of seven has been recorded. Birthing has been observed in May in the Canastra Mountains, but data from captive animals suggest that births are concentrated between June and September. The maned wolf reproduces with difficulty in the wild, with a high rate of infant mortality. Females can go up to two years without breeding. Breeding in captivity is even more difficult, especially in temperate parts of the Northern Hemisphere.

Pups are born weighing between 340 and 430 g (12 and 15 oz). They begin their lives with black fur, becoming red after 10 weeks. The eyes open at about 9 days of age. They are nursed up to 4 months. Afterwards, they are fed by their parents by regurgitation, starting on the third week of age and lasting up to 10 months. Three-month-old pups begin to accompany their mother while she forages. Males and females both engage in parental care, but it is primarily done by the females. Data on male parental care have been collected from captive animals, and little is known whether this occurs frequently in the wild. Maned wolves reach sexual maturity at one year of age, when they leave their birth territory.

The maned wolf's longevity in the wild is unknown, but estimates in captivity are between 12 and 15 years. A report was made of an individual at the São Paulo Zoo that lived to be 22 years old.

=== Diet ===
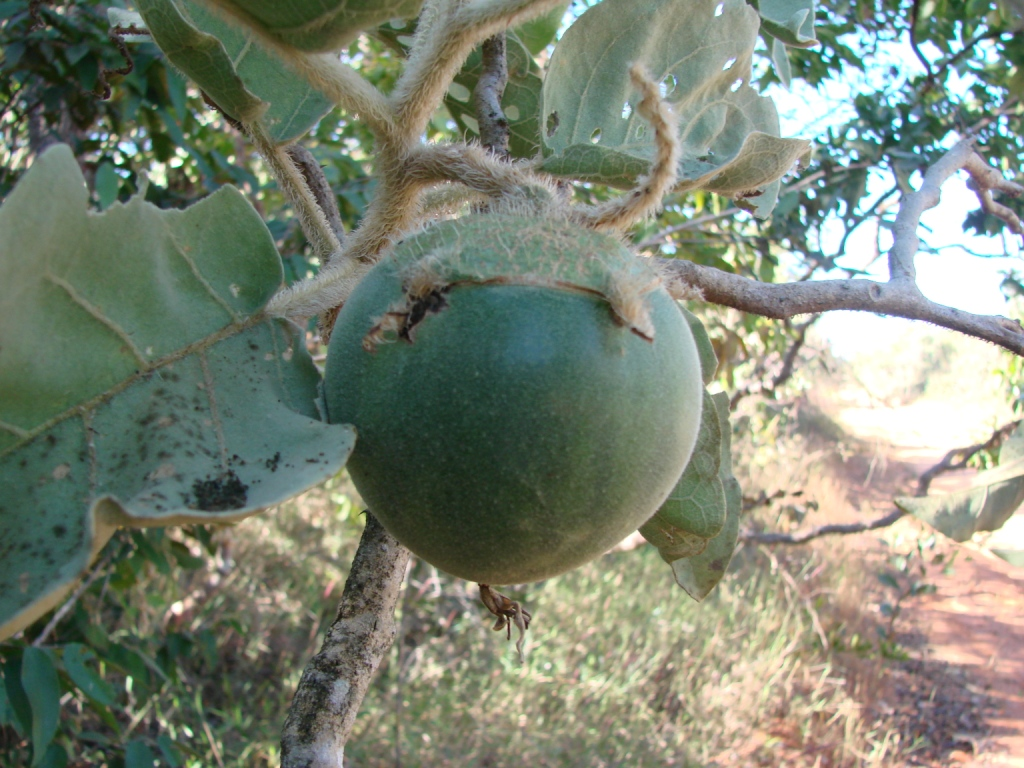
Fruit of the wolf apple, one of the main plant foods of the maned wolf

The maned wolf is omnivorous. It specialises in preying on small and medium-sized animals, including small mammals (typically rodents and rabbits), birds and their eggs, reptiles, and even fish, gastropods, other terrestrial molluscs, and insects, but the main portion of its diet is vegetable matter, including fruit, sugarcane, tubers, bulbs, and other roots. Up to 301 food items have been recorded in the maned wolf's diet, including 116 plants and 178 animal species.

The wolf apple (Solanum lycocarpum), a tomato-like fruit, is the maned wolf's most common food item. With some exceptions, these fruits make up 40–90% of the maned wolf's diet. The wolf apple is actively sought by the maned wolf, and is consumed throughout the year, unlike other fruits that can only be eaten in abundance during the rainy season. It can consume several fruits at a time and disperse intact seeds by defecating, making it an excellent disperser of the wolf apple plant.

The maned wolf hunts by chasing its prey, digging holes, and jumping to catch birds in flight. About 21% of hunts are successful. Some authors have recorded active pursuits of the Pampas deer. They were also observed feeding on carcasses of run down animals. Fecal analysis has shown consumption of the giant anteater, bush dog, and collared peccary, but whether these animals are actively hunted or scavenged is not known. Armadillos are also commonly consumed. Animals are more often consumed in the dry season.

Despite their preferred habitat, maned wolves are ecologically flexible and can survive in disturbed habitats, from burned areas to places with high human influences. Burned areas have some small mammals, such as hairy-tailed bolo mouse (Necromys lasiurus) and vesper mouse (Calomys spp.) that they can hunt and survive on.

Historically, captive maned wolves were fed meat-heavy diets, but that caused them to develop bladder stones. Zoo diets for them now feature fruits and vegetables, as well as meat and specialized extruded diet formulated for maned wolves to be low in stone-causing compounds (i.e. cystine).

== Relations with other species ==
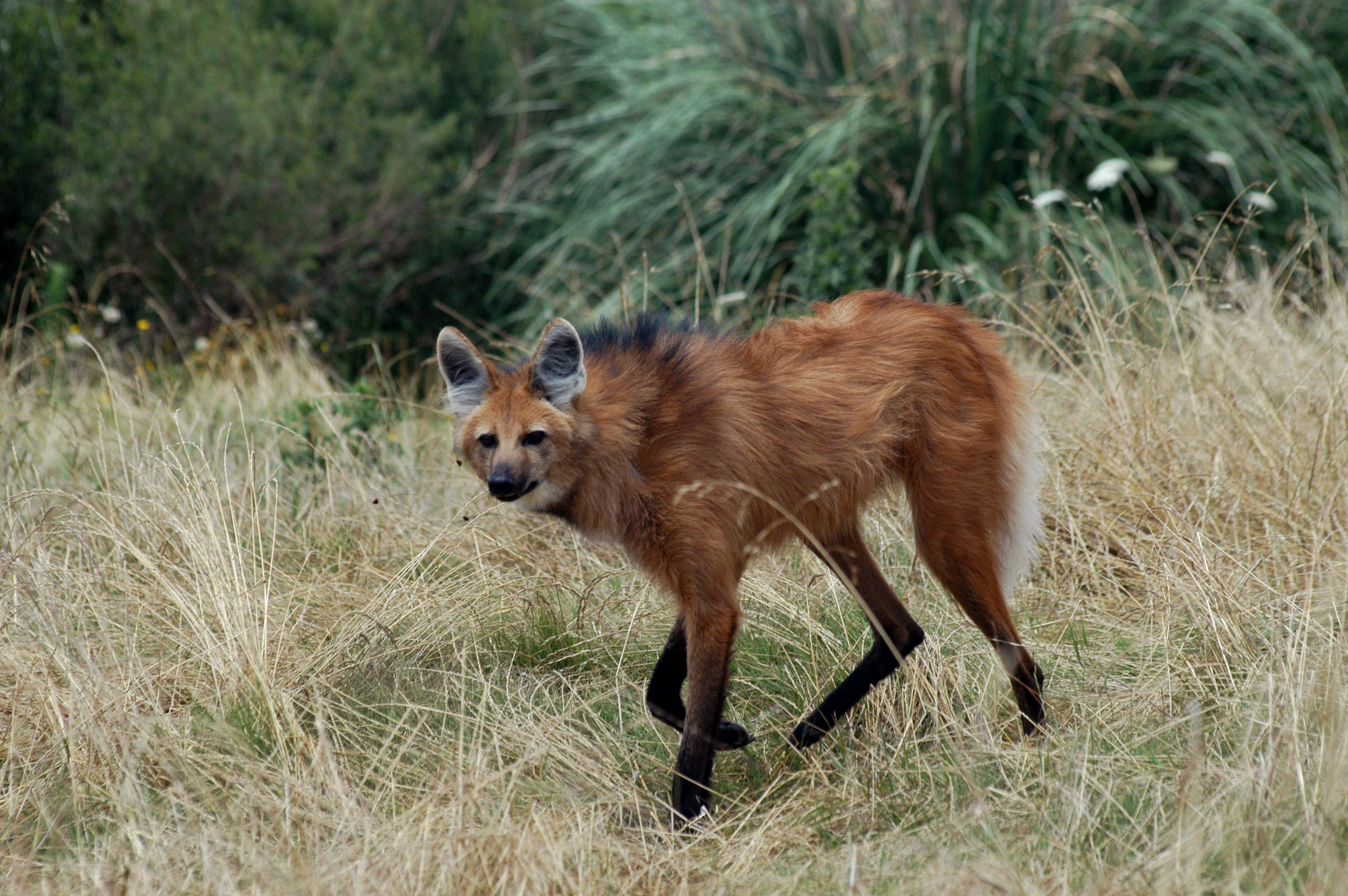
In Uruguay.

The maned wolf participates in symbiotic relationships. It contributes to the propagation and dissemination of the plants on which it feeds, through excretion. Often, maned wolves defecate on the nests of leafcutter ants. The ants then use the dung to fertilize their fungus gardens, but they discard the seeds contained in the dung onto refuse piles just outside their nests. This process significantly increases the germination rate of the seeds.

Maned wolves suffer from ticks, mainly of the genus Amblyomma, and by flies such as Cochliomyia hominivorax usually on the ears. The maned wolf is poorly parasitized by fleas. The sharing of territory with domestic dogs results in a number of diseases, such as rabies virus, parvovirus, distemper, canine adenovirus, protozoan Toxoplasma gondii, bacterium Leptospira interrogans, and nematode Dirofilaria immitis. The maned wolf has been found to host intestinal parasites, such as the acanthocephala worm, Pachysentis canicola. The maned wolf is particularly susceptible to potentially fatal infection by the giant kidney worm.

It is preyed upon by large cats such as the jaguar (Panthera onca) and occasionally the puma.

=== Humans ===
Generally, the maned wolf is shy and flees when alarmed, so it poses little direct threat to humans. Popularly, the maned wolf is thought to have the potential of being a chicken thief. It once was considered a similar threat to cattle, sheep, and pigs, although this now is known to be false. Historically, in a few parts of Brazil, they were hunted for some body parts, notably the eyes, that were believed to be good-luck charms. Since its classification as a vulnerable species by the Brazilian government, it has received greater consideration and protection.

They are threatened by habitat loss and being run over by automobiles. Feral and domestic dogs pass on diseases to them, and have been known to attack them.

The species occurs in several protected areas, including the national parks of Caraça and Emas in Brazil. The maned wolf is well represented in captivity, and has been bred successfully at many zoos, particularly in Argentina, North America (part of a Species Survival Plan) and Europe (part of a European Endangered Species Programme). In 2012, a total of 3,288 maned wolves were kept at more than 300 institutions worldwide. The Smithsonian National Zoo Park has been working to protect maned wolves for nearly 30 years, and coordinates the collaborative, interzoo maned wolf Species Survival Plan of North America, which includes breeding maned wolves, studying them in the wild, protecting their habitat, and educating people about them.

==== Hunting ====
The practice of hunting maned wolves is historically poorly documented, but it is speculated to be relatively frequent. This is partly because during the Portuguese and Spanish colonization of South America, Europeans projected onto the maned wolf the historical aversion they had towards Iberian wolves, and their reputation for eating sheep and other domestic animals. Although the species is now seen in a better light, many people still consider it a potential risk to domestic birds and children.

In Brazil, the impacts of hunting are better known than in Argentina, as is the impact of predation on domestic birds, which engenders retaliation from farmers. They are also accused of attacking sheep, which increases human animosity. In Brazil, people also aimed to prevent them from attacking chickens by using a Brazilian variant of the Portuguese podengo, called the Brazilian podengo or Crioulo podengo.

== Evolution ==
Phylogenetic relationships of South American canids

- - - Maned wolf (Chrysocyon brachyurus)
    - Bush dog (Speothos venaticus)
  - - Short-eared dog (Atelocynus microtis)
    - - Crab-eating fox (Cerdocyon thous)
      - genus Lycalopex — South American foxes

Phylogeny based on molecular and morphological evidence.

The maned wolf is part of the diverse radiation of canids that occur in South America. Molecular analyses have consistently recovered a close evolutionary relationship between the maned wolf and the bush dog (Speothos venaticus), despite their extreme differences in body form, ecology, and diet.

A comparative genomic analysis published more recently also recovered Chrysocyon and Speothos as sister lineages and emphasized their exceptionally divergent adaptations. The maned wolf is highly specialized for life in open habitats and has a largely omnivorous diet, whereas the bush dog is strongly hypercarnivorous and possesses specialized dentition associated with prey capture and processing.

The common ancestor of the living South American endemic canids was estimated by Perini et al. to have lived approximately 4.2–4.3 million years ago, with the radiation occurring during the Pliocene. The divergence between the ancestors of the maned wolf and bush dog was estimated at approximately 3.0 million years ago.

The same analysis estimated that the lineage containing Atelocynus, Cerdocyon, and Lycalopex diverged at approximately 2.4–2.7 million years ago. Diversification within Lycalopex itself occurred over a comparatively short period during the Pleistocene, suggesting a rapid radiation of the South American foxes.

The evolutionary history of South American canids is closely linked to the Great American Interchange. Molecular dating has suggested that the diversification of the living endemic South American canids occurred around the time of, or shortly after, the establishment of the Isthmus of Panama. However, Perini et al. proposed that the earliest diversification of the lineage may have begun in North America before the final establishment of the land bridge.

The fossil record provides additional evidence for the diversification of South American canids. During the Pleistocene, the continent supported several large hypercarnivorous canids, including Protocyon and Theriodictis. A total-evidence phylogenetic analysis combining molecular data with osteological characters placed these extinct genera within the broader South American canid radiation.

The evolutionary history of Chrysocyon itself is unusual. Fossils attributed to the genus are known from North America, including fragmentary remains from early to middle Blancan deposits in Arizona and New Mexico. Perini et al. noted that these fossils are difficult to reconcile straightforwardly with molecular divergence estimates and highlighted the need for additional fossil material to clarify the early history of the genus.

Some earlier phylogenetic studies proposed a different position for the maned wolf. Analyses based on morphology or earlier genetic datasets produced alternative hypotheses regarding relationships with Dusicyon, Lycalopex, or wolf-like canids. More recent molecular and genomic datasets, however, consistently support the close relationship between Chrysocyon and Speothos.

The extreme morphological differences between the maned wolf and bush dog therefore represent an important example of divergent evolution within the canids. Despite sharing a relatively recent common ancestor, the two lineages evolved very different body forms and ecological strategies: the maned wolf developed exceptionally long limbs and adaptations to open habitats, while the bush dog evolved a compact body, specialized carnassial dentition, and strong adaptations for cooperative hunting.

The evolutionary history of the maned wolf therefore combines a relatively recent South American radiation with substantial morphological divergence. Its modern anatomy and ecology are the result of a lineage that became highly specialized while remaining closely related to another exceptionally specialized South American canid, the bush dog.

== Conservation ==
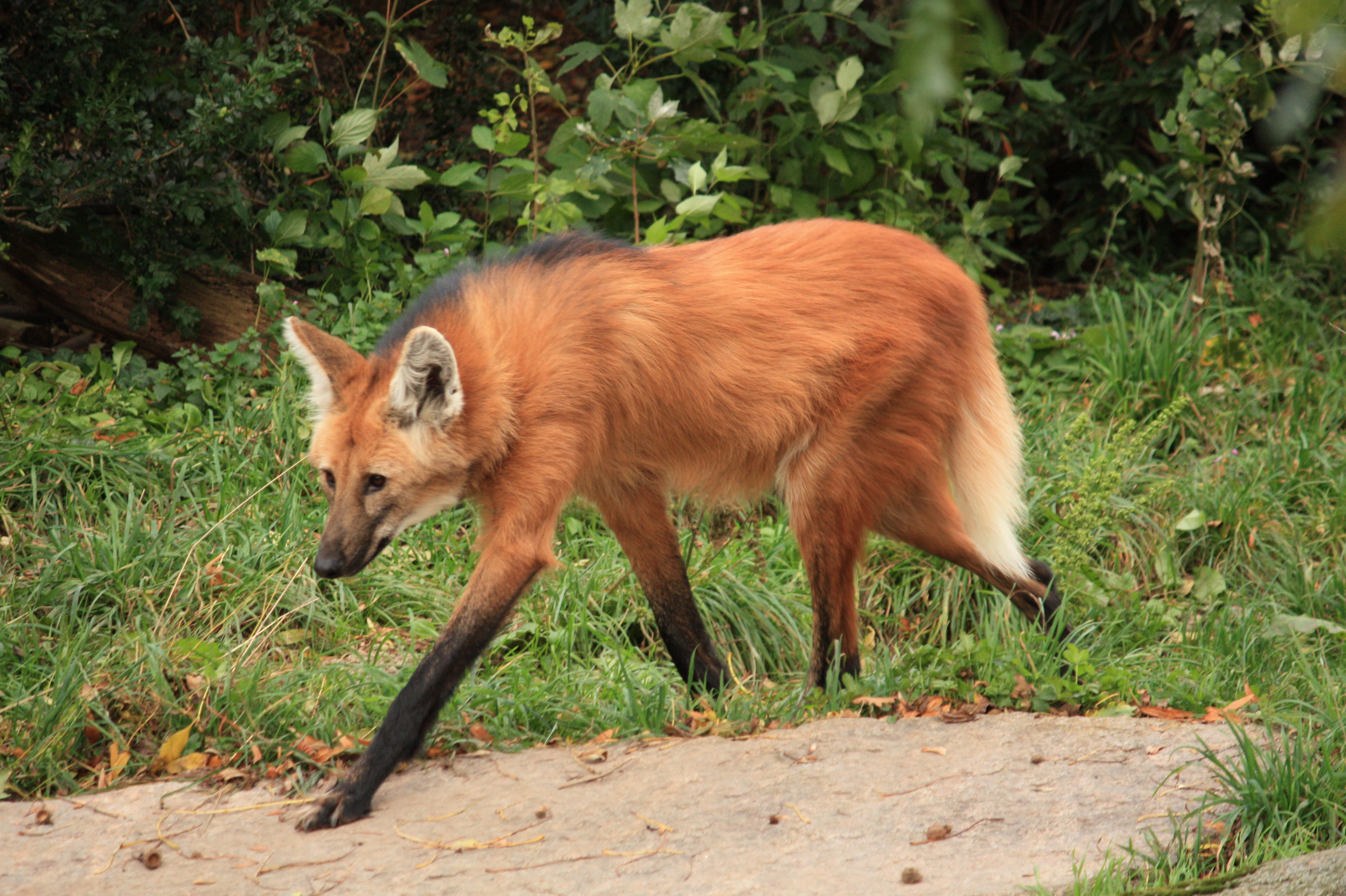

The maned wolf is not considered an endangered species by the IUCN because of its wide geographical distribution and adaptability to man-made environments. However, due to declining populations, it is classified as a near-threatened species. This decline is mostly due to human activities such as deforestation, increasing traffic in highways resulting in roadkill, and urban growth. Due to the decrease in their habitat, the wolves often migrate to urban regions looking for easier access to food. This increases their contact with domestic animals, as well as the risk of infectious and parasitic diseases amongst the wolves which can lead to death.

Until 1996 the maned wolf was a vulnerable species by the IUCN. It is also listed in CITES Appendix II, which regulates international trade in the species. The ICMBio list in Brazil that follows the same IUCN criteria considers the wolf to be a vulnerable species. By these same criteria, the Brazilian state lists also consider it more problematic: it is a vulnerable species in the lists of São Paulo and Minas Gerais, while in the lists of Paraná, Santa Catarina and Rio Grande do Sul the maned wolf is considered as "endangered" and "critically endangered" respectively. In Uruguay, although there is no such list as Brazil and IUCN, it is regarded as a species with "priority" for conservation. In Argentina it is not considered to be in critical danger, but it is recognized that its populations are declining and fragmented. The situation of the maned wolf in Bolivia and Paraguay is uncertain. Even with these uncertainties the maned wolf is protected against hunting in all countries.

In Brazil, Argentina, and Uruguay it is forbidden by law to hunt the maned wolf. Conservationists are also taking other steps to ensure its survival, especially as urbanization continues to spread in its natural habitat.

== In human cultures ==
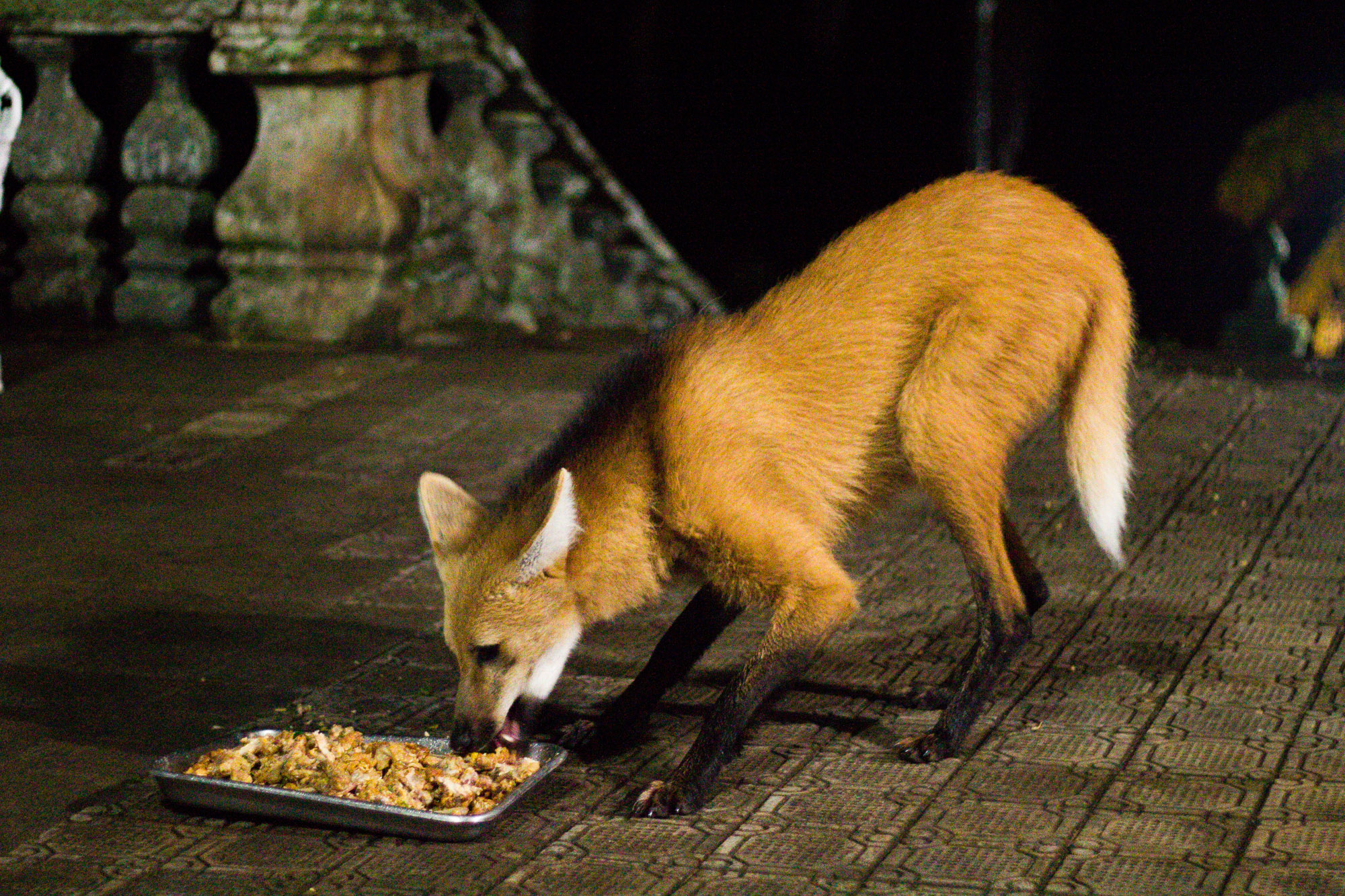
Maned wolf being fed in a church courtyard

Human attitudes and opinions about the maned wolf vary across populations, ranging from fear and tolerance to aversion. In some regions of Brazil, parts of the animal's body are believed to help cure bronchitis, kidney disease, and even snake bites. It is also believed to bring good luck. These parts can be teeth, the heart, ears, and even dry stools. In Bolivia, mounting a saddle made of maned wolf leather is believed to protect from bad luck. Despite these superstitions, no large-scale use of parts of this animal occurs.

In urban societies in Brazil, people tend to be sympathetic to the maned wolf, seeing no value in it as a game animal or pest. They often consider its preservation to be important, and although these societies associate it with force and ferocity, they do not consider it a dangerous animal. Although popular in some places and common in many zoos, it can go unnoticed. Studies in zoos in Brazil showed that up to 30% of respondents were either unaware or unable to recognize a maned wolf.

It was considered a common animal by the Guarani people, and the first names used by Europeans, such as the Spanish Jesuit missionary Joseph of Anchieta, were the same used by the native peoples (yaguaraçú). Spanish naturalist Felix de Azara also used the Guarani name to refer to it and was one of the first to describe the biology of the species and consider it an important part of Paraguay's fauna. Much of the negative view of the maned wolf as a poultry predator stems from European ethnocentrism, where peasants often had problems with wolves and foxes.

The maned wolf rarely causes antipathy in the human populations of the places in which it lives, so it has been used as a flag species for the preservation of the Brazilian cerrado. It is represented on the 200-reais banknote, released in September 2020. It has also been represented on the 100-cruzeiros reais coin, which circulated in Brazil between 1993 and 1994.

== Anatomy ==
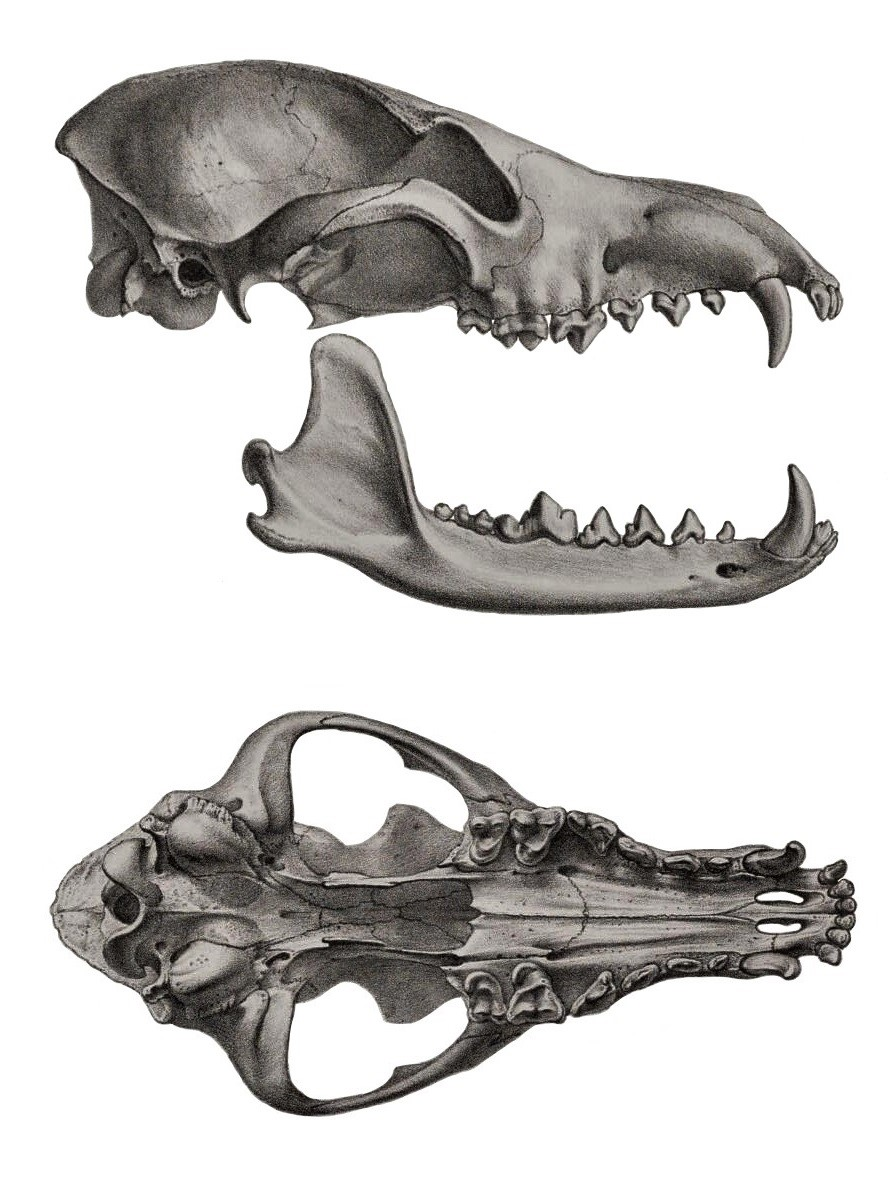
Skull

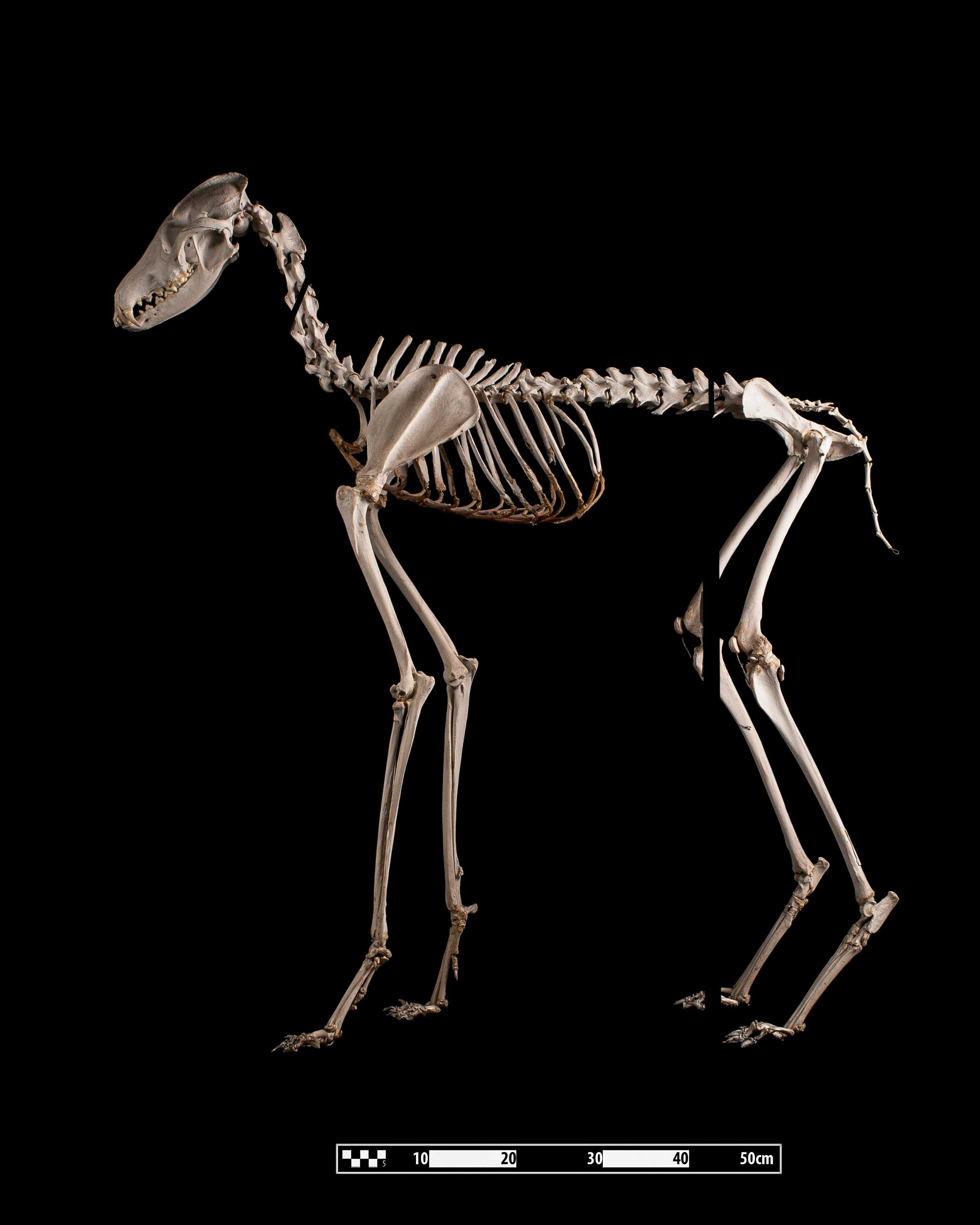
Skeleton

The maned wolf (Chrysocyon brachyurus) has a distinctive body plan among living canids. It has a slender body, exceptionally long legs, large ears, and a relatively small head in proportion to its body. These characteristics are associated with its adaptation to open environments, particularly grasslands and savannas.

=== Skull and dentition ===
The skull of the maned wolf is relatively elongated and lightly built compared with that of many other large canids. The muzzle is relatively long, while the jaws contain the typical heterodont dentition of canids, consisting of incisors, canines, premolars, and molars.

The canine teeth are relatively well developed and are used for handling food and during defensive interactions. The cheek teeth are adapted for processing a varied diet, consistent with the species' omnivorous feeding habits.

=== Skeleton ===
The skeleton is characterized by elongated limb bones and a relatively lightweight construction. The long limbs give the maned wolf a distinctive high-legged appearance and increase its visual height above the surrounding vegetation.

The forelimbs and hindlimbs are adapted primarily for terrestrial locomotion. Unlike cursorial canids such as wolves, however, the maned wolf does not have a body shape specialized for sustained high-speed pursuit.

=== Limbs and feet ===
The most conspicuous anatomical feature of the species is its exceptionally long legs. The lower portions of the limbs are particularly elongated, giving the animal a high shoulder height despite its relatively moderate body mass.

The feet are adapted for walking over open and uneven terrain. The forefeet and hindfeet possess four functional toes, with the claws providing traction while walking and running.

=== Head and ears ===
The head is relatively small compared with the animal's long legs and body. The ears are large, erect, and highly mobile, allowing the maned wolf to detect sounds from its surroundings.

The large ears are also an important visual characteristic of the species and contribute to its distinctive appearance among South American canids.

=== Fur and mane ===
The coat is predominantly reddish-brown or orange-red, with darker coloration on the legs, muzzle, and dorsal region. The lower portions of the legs are commonly dark, while the throat and inner portions of the ears may show lighter coloration.

A characteristic black mane extends from the back of the neck toward the shoulders and upper back. The mane can be raised when the animal is alarmed, excited, or displaying defensive behavior, making the animal appear larger.

=== Tail ===
The tail is relatively short compared with the body and is covered with dense fur. Its coloration is generally similar to that of the body, with lighter tones toward the tip.

=== Body proportions ===
The maned wolf has a distinctive combination of a relatively light body and very long limbs. Adults generally weigh considerably less than large wolves despite reaching a similar or greater height at the shoulder.

This unusual body plan is particularly advantageous in open vegetation, where long legs allow the animal to see above grasses and other vegetation while moving through its habitat.

=== Sexual dimorphism ===
Sexual dimorphism in the maned wolf is relatively subtle. Males are generally somewhat heavier than females, but the sexes have similar external coloration and overall body proportions.

The most obvious differences between males and females are therefore associated with body mass and reproductive anatomy rather than strongly contrasting external morphology.

=== Locomotion ===
The maned wolf is primarily terrestrial and moves mainly by walking and trotting. Its long legs allow it to travel efficiently through grasslands, savannas, and other open habitats.

The species is capable of moving over considerable distances within its home range. Its locomotor anatomy is adapted for endurance and efficient movement rather than prolonged high-speed pursuit of prey.

=== Functional significance ===
A maned wolf.

The anatomy of the maned wolf reflects its specialization for life in open South American environments. Its long legs, large ears, reddish coat, dark mane, and relatively lightweight body distinguish it from other living canids.

The combination of these characteristics allows Chrysocyon brachyurus to move through tall vegetation, detect sounds over relatively open landscapes, and exploit a broad range of food resources.

=== Peripheral nervous system ===
A detailed anatomical study of the phrenic nerve in the maned wolf (Chrysocyon brachyurus) demonstrated that this nerve originates predominantly from the ventral branches of the cervical spinal nerves C5, C6 and C7, showing uni- or plurisegmental patterns of formation. After its formation in the cervical region, the contributing branches converge near the level of the first rib.

At the level of the diaphragm, the phrenic nerve consistently divides into a lumbocostal trunk and a sternal branch. The lumbocostal trunk gives rise to lumbar and costal branches, which innervate the lumbar and costal portions of the diaphragm, while the sternal branch supplies the sternal and adjacent costal portions.

No branches to the central tendon or to the caudal vena cava were observed, and no contribution from the intercostal nerves to diaphragmatic innervation was identified. In all analysed specimens, the phrenic nerve represented the exclusive motor innervation of the diaphragm in this species.

These findings highlight species-specific characteristics of the phrenic nerve in wild canids and demonstrate important differences when compared with domestic dogs and other carnivores, reinforcing the relevance of comparative neuroanatomical studies in Neotropical fauna.

== Gallery ==
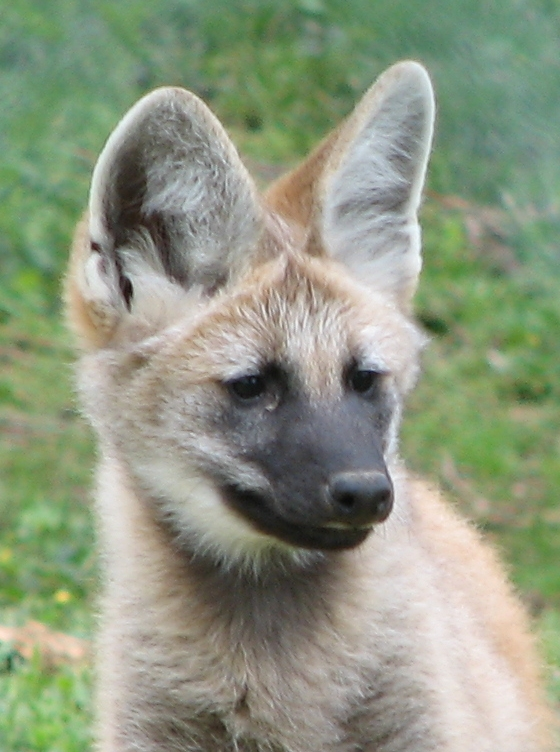
Maned wolf pup

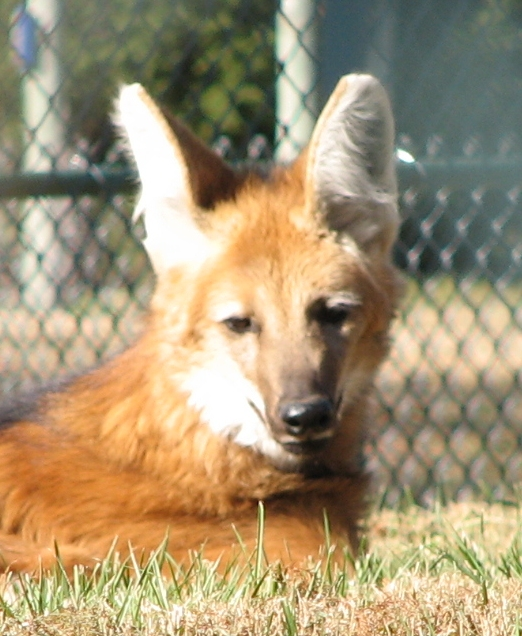
Maned wolf in Louisville Zoo

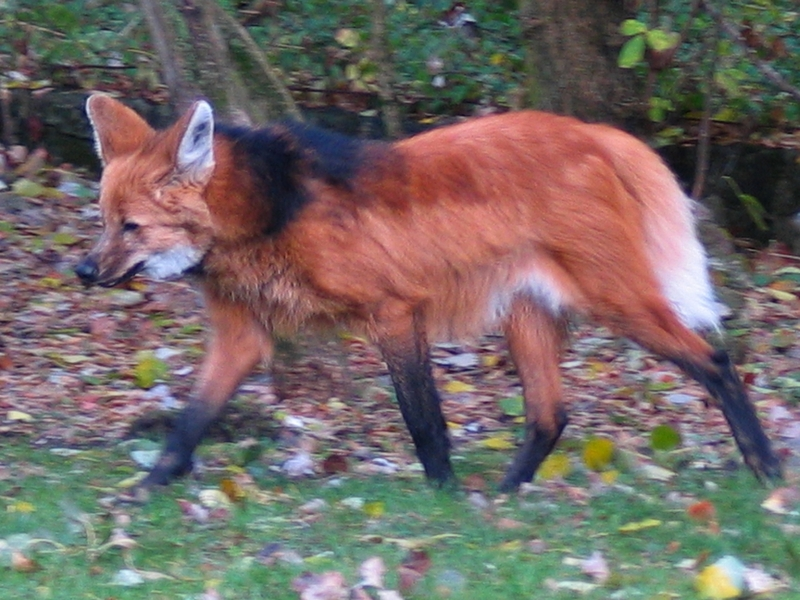

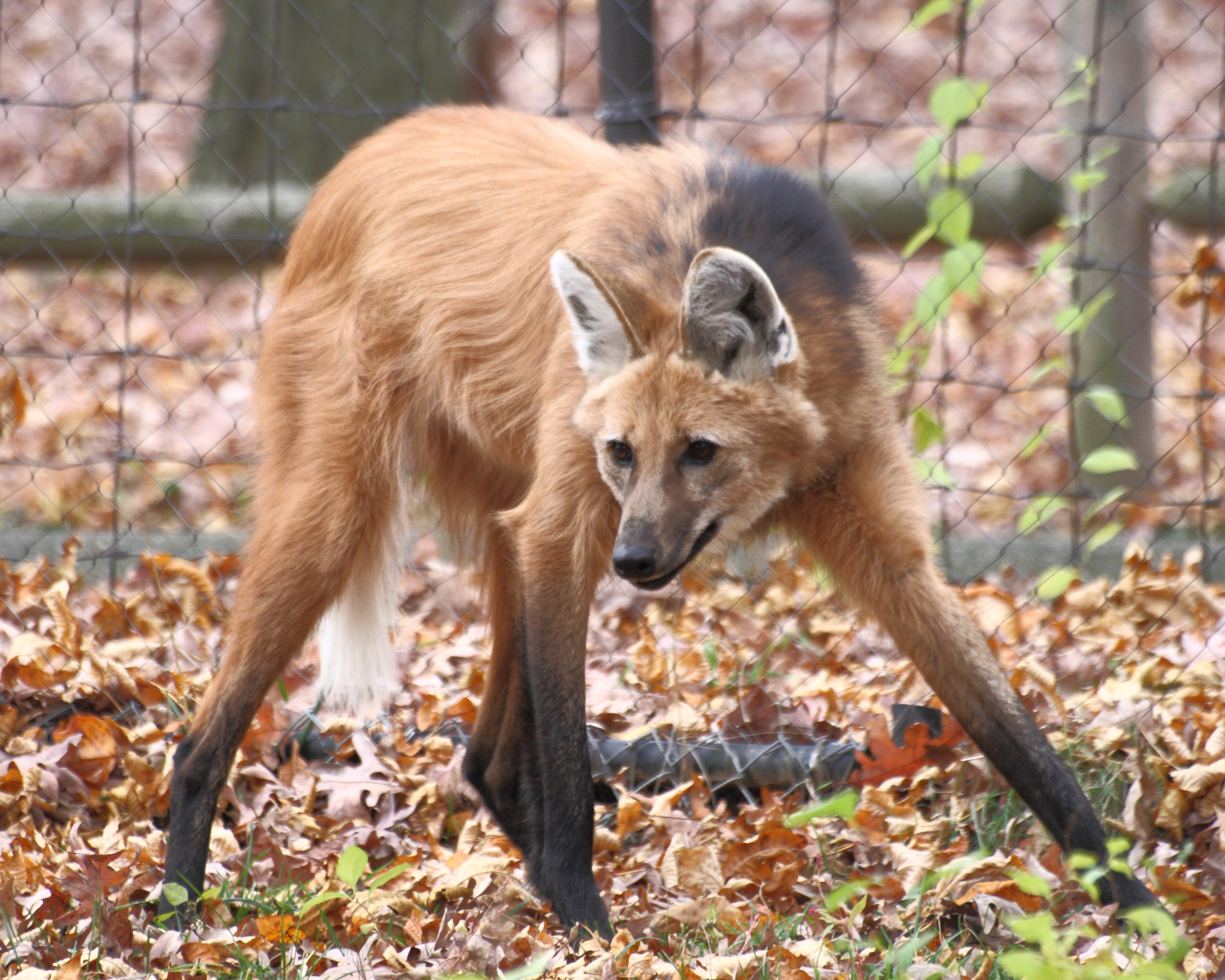
Maned wolf in Beardsley Zoo

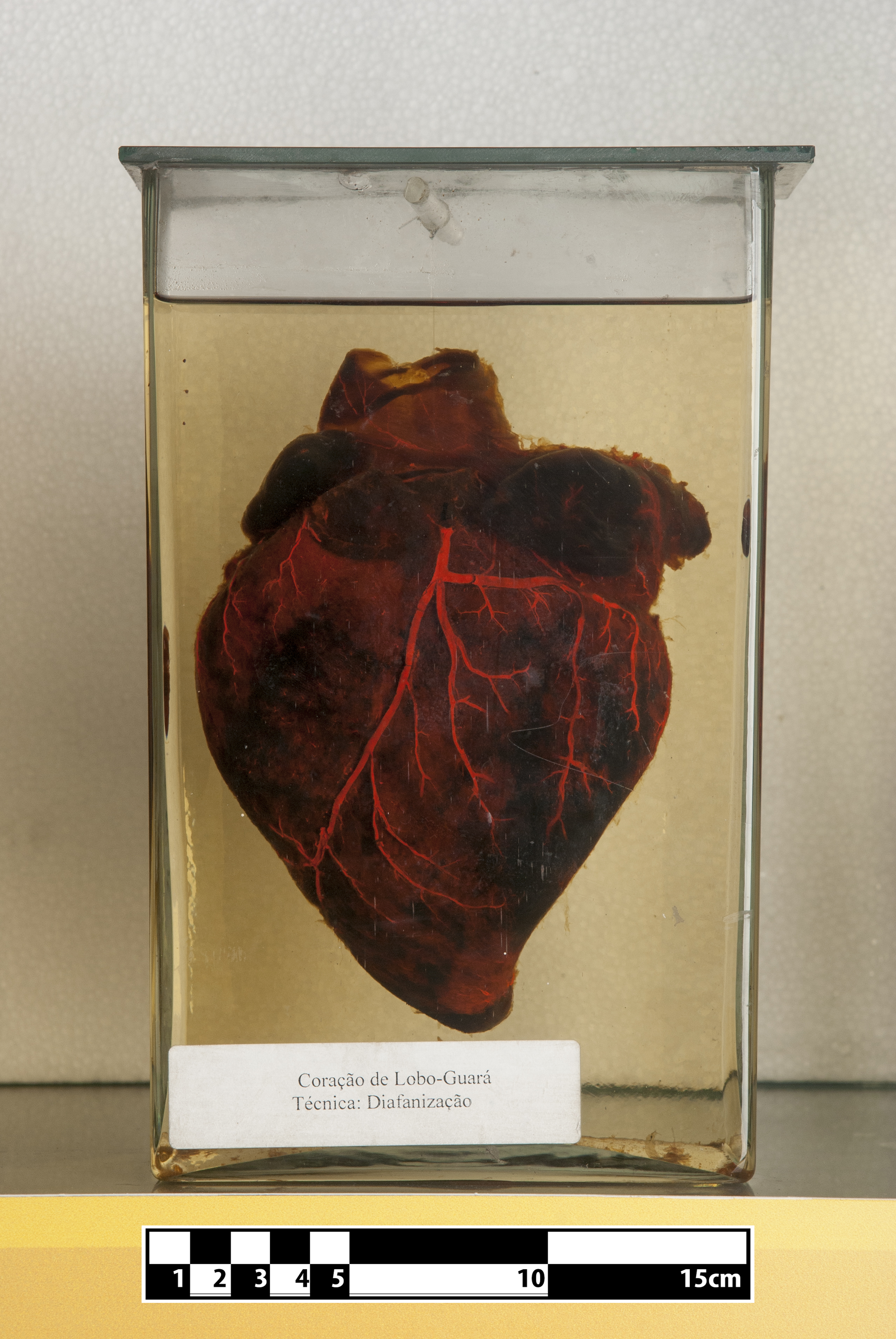
Maned wolf heart

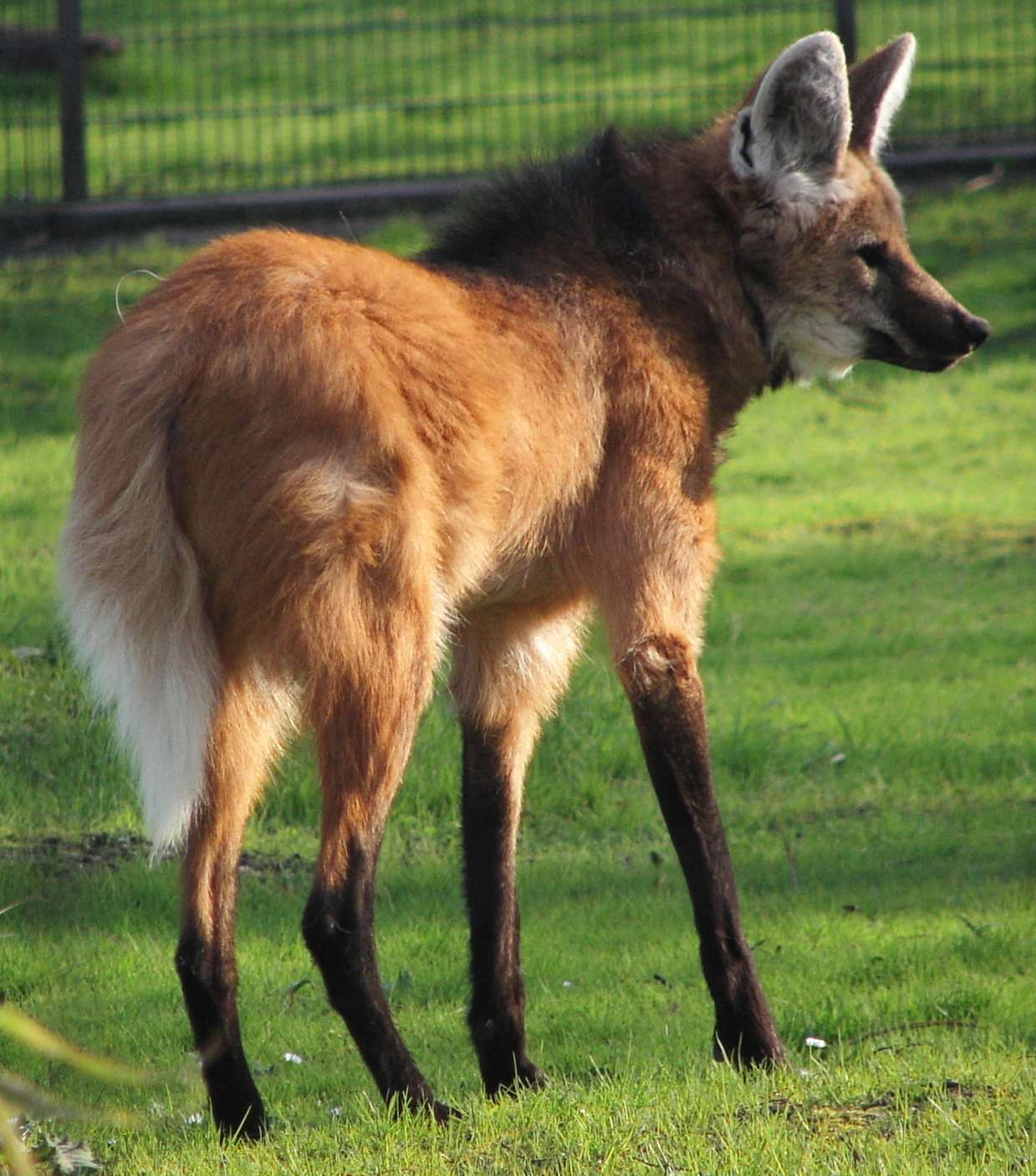
Maned wolf in Cologne Zoo, Germany
