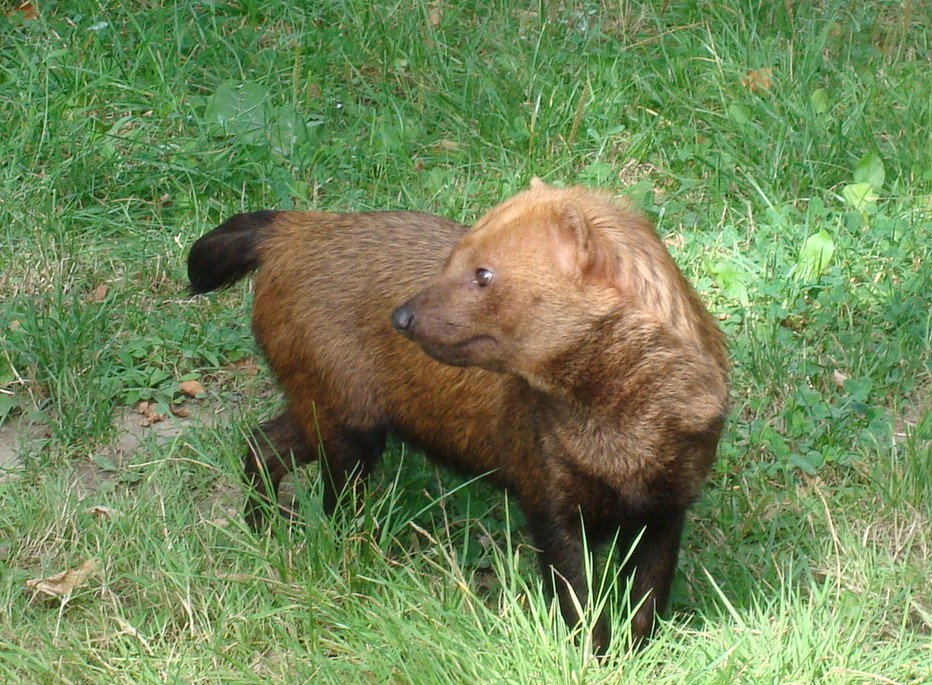

Scientific classification
- Kingdom: Animalia
- Phylum: Chordata
- Class: Mammalia
- Order: Carnivora
- Family: Canidae
- Subfamily: Caninae
- Tribe: Canini
- Genus: Speothos; Lund, 1839

Type species
- †Speothos pacivorus

Species
- †Speothos pacivorus; Speothos venaticus

Synonyms
- Icticyon Lund, 1843; Abathmodon Lund, 1843

= Speothos =

Speothos Temporal range: Pleistocene to Recent

Genus of carnivores

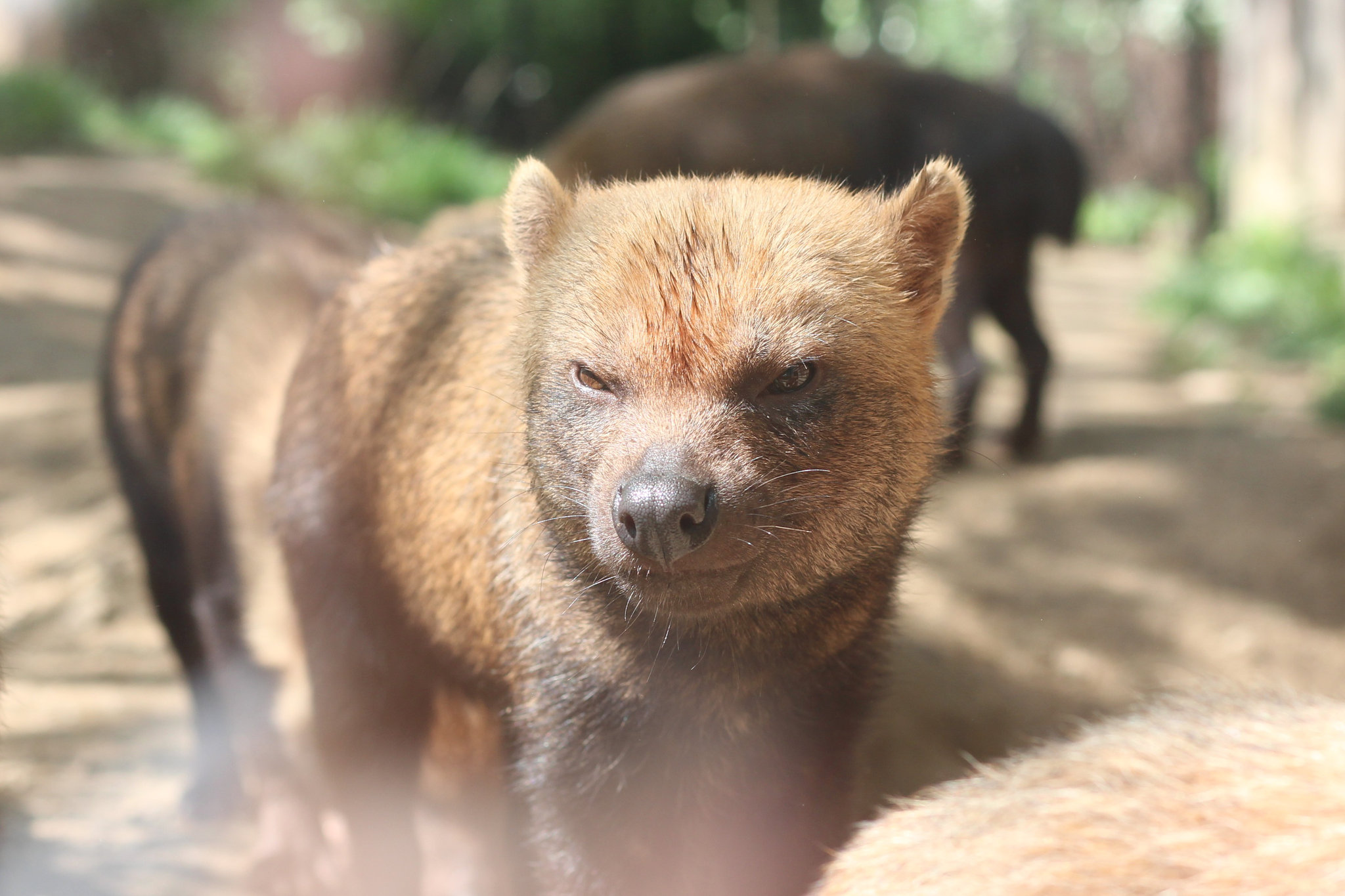
Speothos venaticus

Speothos is a genus of canid found in Central and South America. The genus includes the living bush dog, Speothos venaticus, and an extinct Pleistocene species, Speothos pacivorus. Unusually, the fossil species was identified and named before the extant species was discovered, with the result that the type species of Speothos is S. pacivorus. S. pacivorus had a larger overall body size and a double-rooted second lower molar. It has been proposed that Speothos originated in the Brazilian highlands sometime during the Pleistocene.

The paleobiogeography and evolutionary relationships of Speothos and other South American canids is unclear. Morphological data suggest that Speothos is most closely related to another small canid, Atelocynus (short eared dog). The skulls of both Speothos and Atelocynus have short nasals that terminate rostral to the maxillary-frontal suture, a character shared with Vulpes (fox genus). Speothos and Atelocynus also possess very small frontal sinuses that are minimally expanded. Recent analyses of molecular (mtDNA) data alone and in combination with morphological data support a sister-taxon relationship between Speothos and Chrysocyon (maned wolf); it has been suggested that these highly derived canids diverged at least 3 million years ago, invading South America as separate lineages.

Speothos is distinctive in that it shares similar hypercarnivorous modifications of the dentition with Cuon (dhole) and Lycaon (African wild dog). The crushing role of the post-carnassial molars is reduced. The lower carnassial (m1) of Speothos lacks the entoconid, creating a trenchant (cutting) heel on the tooth. The hypoconid on the heel (talonid) of the m1 fits into a basin in the M1 when the teeth are in occlusion. Speothos and Cuon exhibit reduction in both number and size of the post-carnassial molars.
