= Speothos pacivorus =

Speothos pacivorus Temporal range: Late Pleistocene (Lujanian)- Early Holocene

Scientific classification
- Kingdom: Animalia
- Phylum: Chordata
- Class: Mammalia
- Order: Carnivora
- Family: Canidae
- Genus: Speothos
- Species: †S. pacivorus

Binomial name
- †Speothos pacivorus Lund 1839

Extinct species of carnivore

The Pleistocene bush dog (Speothos pacivorus) is an extinct canid species in the genus Speothos from the Late Pleistocene. It was a relative of the extant bush dog. When compared to the bush dog, S. pacivorus had an overall larger body size, a straighter radial shaft and a double-rooted second lower molar.
