= Domestic sheep predation =

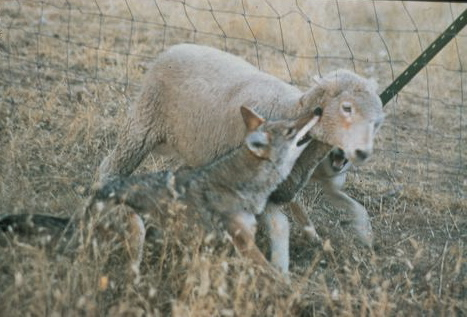
A lamb being attacked by a coyote in the most typical method, a bite to the throat

Along with parasites and disease, predation is a threat to sheep health and therefore to the profitability of sheep farming. Sheep have very little ability to defend themselves, even when compared to other prey species kept as livestock. Even if sheep are not directly bitten or survive an attack, they may die from panic or from injuries sustained.

However, the impact of predation varies dramatically from region to region. In Africa, Australia, the Americas, and parts of Europe and Asia predators can be a serious problem. In contrast, some nations are virtually free of sheep predators. Many islands known for extensive sheep husbandry are suitable largely because of their predator-free status.

Worldwide, canids—including the domestic dog—are responsible for the majority of sheep deaths. Other animals that prey on sheep include felines, birds of prey, bears and feral hogs.

== Relation to sheep behavior ==
Sheep flight behavior was identified in one major study in California as being the primary catalyst for eliciting predatory behavior in coyotes. Even coyotes that had never previously been exposed to sheep demonstrated predatory behavior when exposed to sheep for the first time. Of particular interest was that coyotes with no previous experience of killing prey readily attacked and killed sheep when given the opportunity. The coyotes were likely to attack sheep exhibiting flight behavior even when these coyotes were not hungry. The same study also found that dominant coyotes were more likely to attack sheep.

== By region ==
=== North America ===
According to the National Agricultural Statistics Service, 224,200 sheep were killed in the U.S. by predators in 2004, comprising approximately 37% of all bovine deaths for that year. The sheep lost in that year represented a sum total of 18.3 million dollars for sheep producers. Coyotes were responsible for 60.5% of all deaths, with the next largest being domestic dogs at 13.3%. Other North American predators of sheep included cougars (5.7%), bobcats (4.9%), eagles (2.8%), bears (3.8%), and foxes (1.9%). Wolves, ravens, vultures, and other animals together made up the remaining 7.1% of deaths. As all NASS statistics on sheep only take into account sheep after docking, the American Sheep Industry Association estimates that an additional 50–60,000 lambs were killed (before docking) that were not a part of the count. The number of sheep lost to predators may also be higher when considering that reports are generally only made when there is a reasonable expectation that a producer will be financially reimbursed for the loss.

=== South America ===
In South America, the only widespread potential predators of sheep are cougars and jaguars, both of which are known to prey on livestock regularly. South American canids such as the maned wolf and foxes of the genus Lycalopex are also blamed for sheep deaths, but there is no evidence for a statistically significant amount of predation by most of these species. However, the culpeo is considered a threat to sheep, and is responsible for 60% of the predator losses in Patagonia.

=== Africa ===
Although large, the South African sheep industry is significantly hindered by the numerous predators present in the country. Other African nations that rely on sheep face a similar problem.

Black-backed jackals are the most significant sheep predators of southern and eastern Africa. Jackal predation typically peaks during droughts when wild food is scarce and the sheep are weakened. Merino sheep tend to be the most vulnerable, due to their habit of scattering upon attack, unlike fat-tailed sheep which bunch together for defence. In Transvaal between 1965 and 1971, a study on the stomach contents of over 400 jackals showed that sheep constituted 6% of the diet of jackals living in game reserves, and 27% for those living near farming districts. A similar study in Natal revealed that sheep constituted 35% of the resident jackal's diet.

=== Australia and New Zealand ===
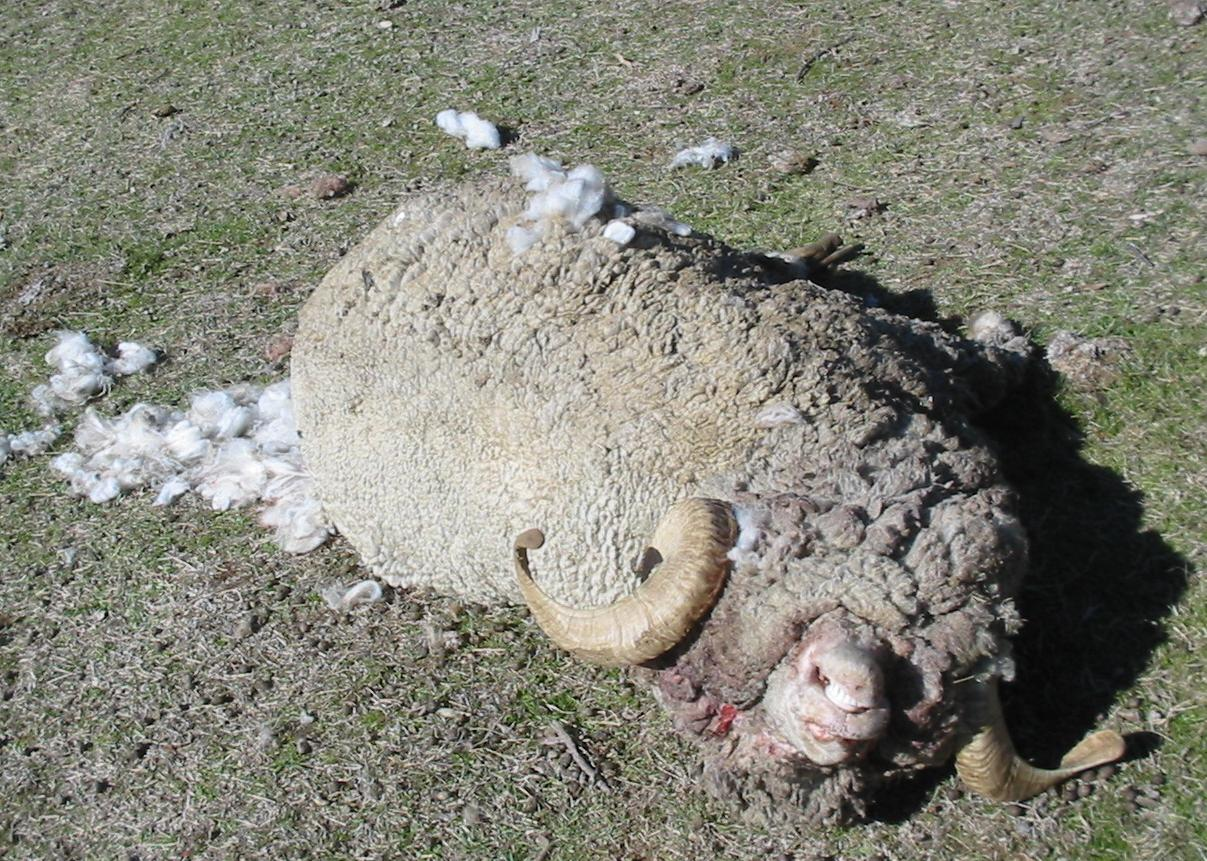
One of several rams and wethers that were killed during an attack by domestic dogs.

The main Australian predator of sheep is the dingo, which is such a threat to sheep that it prompted the construction of the world's largest fence: the Dingo Fence. Red foxes can also prey on 10-30% of lambs, costing Australians sheep breeders more than A$100 million annually. Annual baiting programs are conducted to reduce the numbers of dingoes and foxes. Uncontrolled domestic dogs also regularly threaten and kill sheep. Occasionally wedge-tailed eagles will kill young sheep up to and including hogget size sheep. Prior to its extinction in Tasmania the thylacine, also called the Tasmanian tiger, was also thought to be a major predator of sheep; however, this was unfounded, as thylacine jaws were not strong enough to kill sheep. Blame for supposed predation on sheep hastened its persecution by farmers and eventual extinction.

In contrast, New Zealand has no remaining large carnivores since the extinction of the Haast's eagle. The only wild animal known to attack sheep in New Zealand is the rare, unusual kea parrot endemic to the country's South Island.

=== British Isles ===
Brown bears are thought to have become extinct in the British Isles in the year 500, while the last wolves were wiped out in 1786. Today the only wild animals that pose a plausible threat to lambs in the British Isles are the red fox, the European badger, and eagles. Domestic dogs are also a frequent cause of predation on lambs and sheep, which can also sometimes die of shock after any attempted predation or attack by a dog.

There are numerous anecdotal reports of badgers predating sheep or lambs, but there is very little concrete evidence of attacks. Badgers will scavenge carcasses of animals that have died from other causes. Although they are capable of killing lambs, there is little evidence that this is anything more than an occasional occurrence. An independent report on the impact of badgers on sheep cited a 2019 Scottish survey of sheep farmers, which found that 11% of the interviewed farmers who believed they had experienced sheep predation attributed at least some of their losses to badgers, despite a lack of direct observation of these attacks by the respondents. The report also noted that predation (by many species, not just badgers) is often both misidentified and overestimated, making it difficult to arrive at an accurate figure for badger attacks.

Corvids such as the hooded crow and Eurasian magpie are known to kill lambs, often first incapacitating them by pecking out their eyes, especially if a sheep has fallen over during parturition or inclement weather. Larger predatory birds such as golden eagles and white-tailed eagles may pose a threat to sheep in the north of Britain, where their ranges remain stable, but studies show that overall levels of predation are likely to be low (in the order of 1-3%), although a small number of farmers may occasionally suffer slightly higher losses.

=== Mainland Europe ===
In Greece, 21,000 sheep and goats were killed by wolves between April 1989 and June 1991. In 1998, 5,894 sheep and goats were killed.

In southern Bulgaria, golden jackals were recorded to have attacked 1,053 sheep between 1982–87.

=== Asia ===
A study of livestock predation taken in Tibet showed that the Himalayan wolf was the most prominent predator, accounting for 60% of the total livestock losses, followed by the snow leopard (38%) and the Eurasian lynx (2%). Sheep were the second most targeted victims after goats, accounting for over 30% of losses.

== Prevention ==
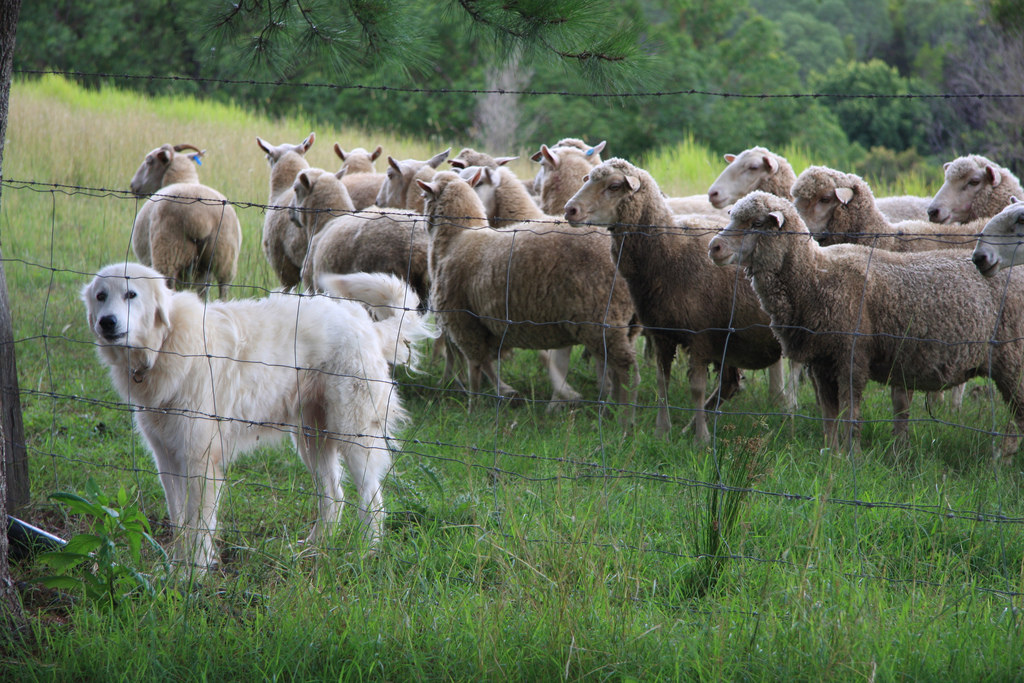
A Maremma Sheepdog livestock guardian dog with its flock

Throughout history, shepherds have attempted to combat predation of their flocks in a variety of ways. Pre-modern shepherds had only the most basic of tools: their own presence, livestock guardian dogs, and protective structures such as barns and fencing. Fencing (both regular and electric), penning sheep at night and lambing indoors all continue to be widely–used methods of protection today. While sheepdogs herd sheep, guardian dogs are trained to integrate into flocks and protect them from predators. The ability of these dogs to do so is a transference of the canine pack social structure on to a flock. Following their invention, the focus of predator management shifted to the almost exclusive use of guns, traps, and poisons to kill predators both defensively and preemptively. The populations of predator species plummeted worldwide, driving some to extinction (such as the thylacine) or significantly reducing their original ranges. With the advent of the environmental and conservation movements, and subsequent state, provincial, national and international legislation, the simple extermination of predator species was no longer a legally viable option for protecting herds. However, many countries maintain government agencies—such as the Wildlife Services program, a wing of the USDA's Animal and Plant Health Inspection Service —to shoot, poison and trap predators that threaten sheep. Wildlife conservation organizations charge that this killing is both indiscriminate and ineffective at protecting sheep.

The 1970s saw a resurgence in the use of livestock guardian dogs and the development of new methods of predator control, many of them non–lethal. Donkeys and guard llamas or alpacas have been used since the 1980s in sheep operations, using the same basic principle as livestock guardian dogs. Interspecific grazing, usually with larger livestock such as cattle or horses, may also help to deter predators, even if such species do not actively guard sheep. In addition to animal guards, modern sheep farms may use non–lethal predator deterrents such as motion–activated lights and noisy alarms. While these devices have been shown to be successful, predators can become habituated to them.
