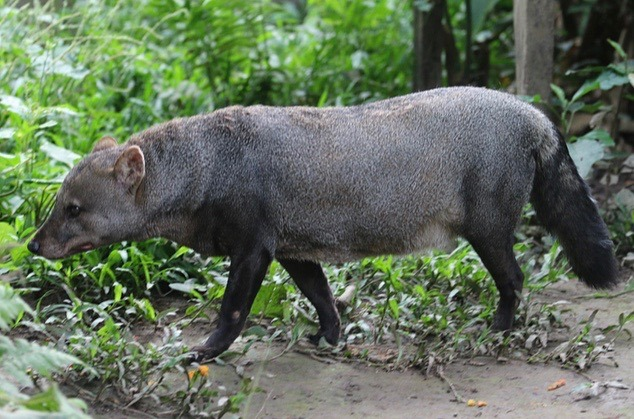

Conservation status
- Near Threatened (IUCN 3.1)

Scientific classification
- Kingdom: Animalia
- Phylum: Chordata
- Class: Mammalia
- Order: Carnivora
- Family: Canidae
- Tribe: Canini
- Subtribe: Cerdocyonina
- Genus: Atelocynus; Cabrera, 1940
- Species: A. microtis

Binomial name
- Atelocynus microtis (Sclater, 1883)
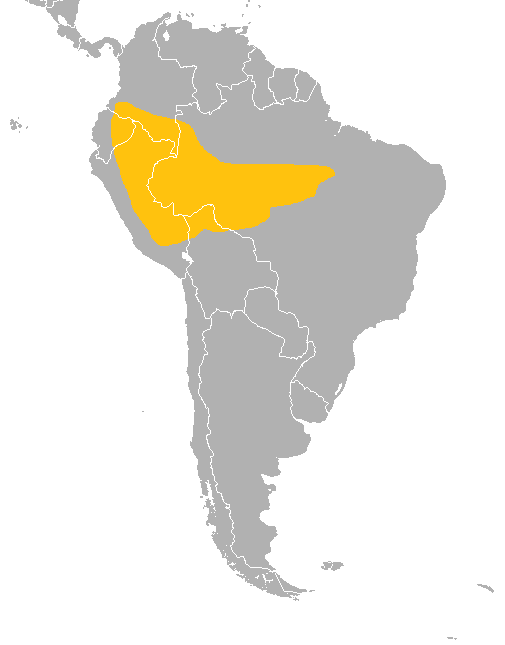
- Short-eared dog range

= Short-eared dog =

Species of carnivore

The short-eared dog (Atelocynus microtis), also known as the small-eared dog, short-eared fox or small eared zorro, is an elusive canid species endemic to the Amazonian basin. This is the only species assigned to the genus Atelocynus.

== Other names ==
The short-eared dog has many names in the local languages where it is endemic, including cachorro-do-mato-de-orelha-curta in Portuguese, zorro de oreja corta ("short-ear fox") in Spanish, nomensarixi in Chiquitano, uálaca in Yucuna, cuachi yaguar in Guarayu, quinamco in Mooré, and achuj in Ninam and Mosetén.

Other common names in Spanish include zorro ojizarco ("blue-eyed fox"), zorro sabanero ("savannah fox"), and zorro negro ("black fox").

== Description ==
The short-eared dog has short and slender limbs with short and rounded ears. It has a distinctive fox-like muzzle and bushy tail. Its paws are partly webbed, helping adapt it to its partly aquatic habitat.

Its fur ranges from dark to reddish-grey, but can also be nearly navy blue, coffee brown, dark grey, or chestnut-grey to black, and the coat is short, with thick and bristly fur. It has a somewhat narrow chest, with dark color variation on the thorax merging to brighter, more reddish tones on the abdominal side of the body.

== Habitat ==
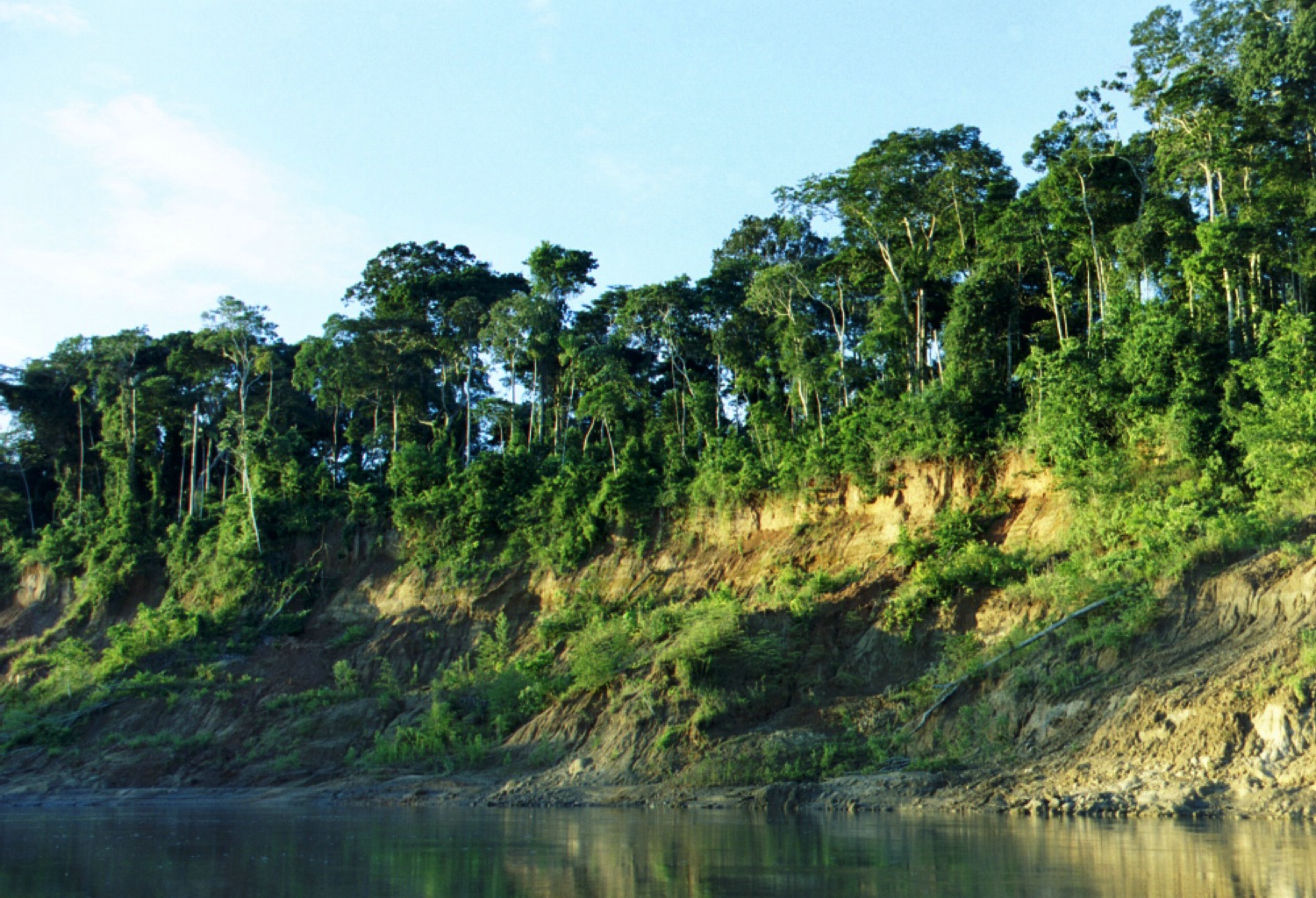
Manú National Park, Madre de Dios, Peru

The short-eared dog can be found in the Amazon rainforest region of South America (in Brazil, Bolivia, Peru, Colombia, Ecuador and possibly Venezuela). There is a single report of "three slender, doglike animals" of this species sighted in the Darien region of Panama in 1984 by German biologist Sigi Weisel and a native Embera-nation Panamanian; this rare species' presence in Panama is possible because of "the continuous mass of forest habitat that covers this region". It lives in various parts of the rainforest environment, preferring areas with little human disturbance. It lives in both lowland forests known as Floresta Amazônica and terra firme forest, as well as in swamp forest, stands of bamboo, and cloud forest. It is a solitary animal and prefers to remain under tree-cover, avoiding both human and other animal interaction.

== Diet ==
This wild dog is mainly a carnivore, with fish, insects, and small mammals making up the majority of its diet. An investigation led in the Cocha Cashu Biological Station in Peru into the proportions of different kinds of food in this animal's diet produced the following results:

fish	28%	birds	10%
insects	17%	crabs	10%
small mammals	13%	frogs	4%
various fruits	10%	reptiles	3%

== Reproduction and behavior ==
This species has some behaviors not typical for other canids. Females of this species are about one-third larger than males. The excited male sprays a musk produced by the tail glands. It prefers a solitary lifestyle, in forest areas. It avoids humans in its natural environment. Agitated males raise the hairs on their backs.

The lifespan and gestation period of the short-eared dog are unknown, although sexual maturity is reached at three years of age, relatively late compared to other canid species.

== Evolution ==
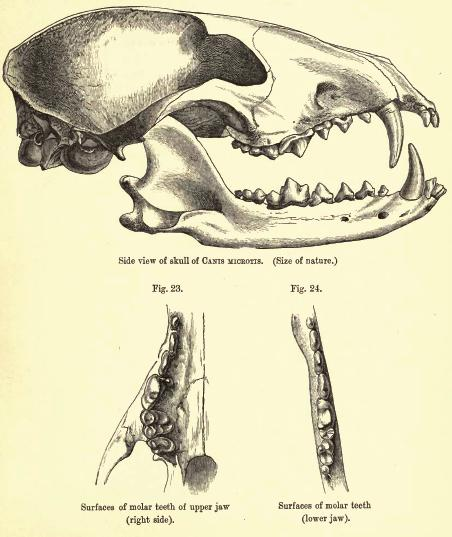
Short-eared dog skull

In 2022, a study sequenced the genomes of the living members of the subtribe Cerdocyonina, which indicates that they commenced diversifying from a common ancestor between 3.9—3.5 million years ago. This finding is consistent with the ancestor arriving in South America from Central America through the Isthmus of Panama and then entering into eastern South America. The subtribe then expanded to occupy the entire continent.

After the formation of the Isthmus of Panama in the latter part the Tertiary (about 2.5 million years ago in the Pliocene), canids migrated from North America to the southern continent as part of the Great American Interchange. The short-eared dog's ancestors adapted to life in tropical rainforests, developing the requisite morphological and anatomical features. Although it has a superficial resemblance to the bush dog, the short-eared dog's closest living relative is the crab-eating fox. It is one of the most unusual canids.

The species is monotypic. The name sclateri (J. A. Allen, 1905), sometimes listed as a subspecies, is treated as a synonym.

== Ecology ==
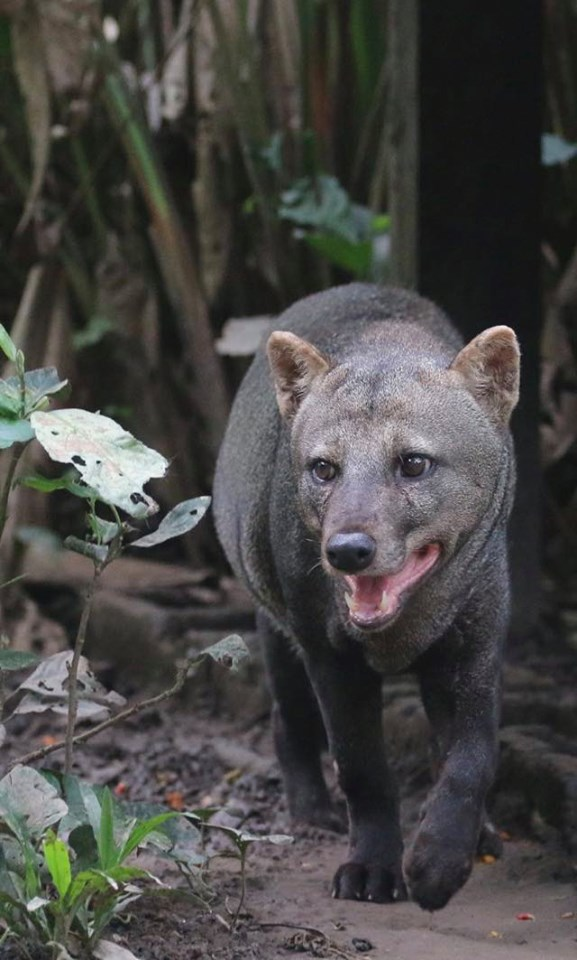
In the Amazon rainforest, Peru

Feral dogs pose a prominent threat to the population of short-eared dogs, as they facilitate the spread of diseases, such as canine distemper and rabies, to the wild population. The short eared dog suffers greatly from loss of habitat. There is a significant amount of disturbance in formerly remote South American forests, and almost no habitat except where daily human settler and prospector traffic destroys or exposes their dens. Humans also contribute to their extermination by degradation of the species' natural habitat and the general destruction of tropical rainforests.

The short-eared dog is currently considered near threatened by the IUCN. No comprehensive ecological and genetic research has been carried out on the species.
