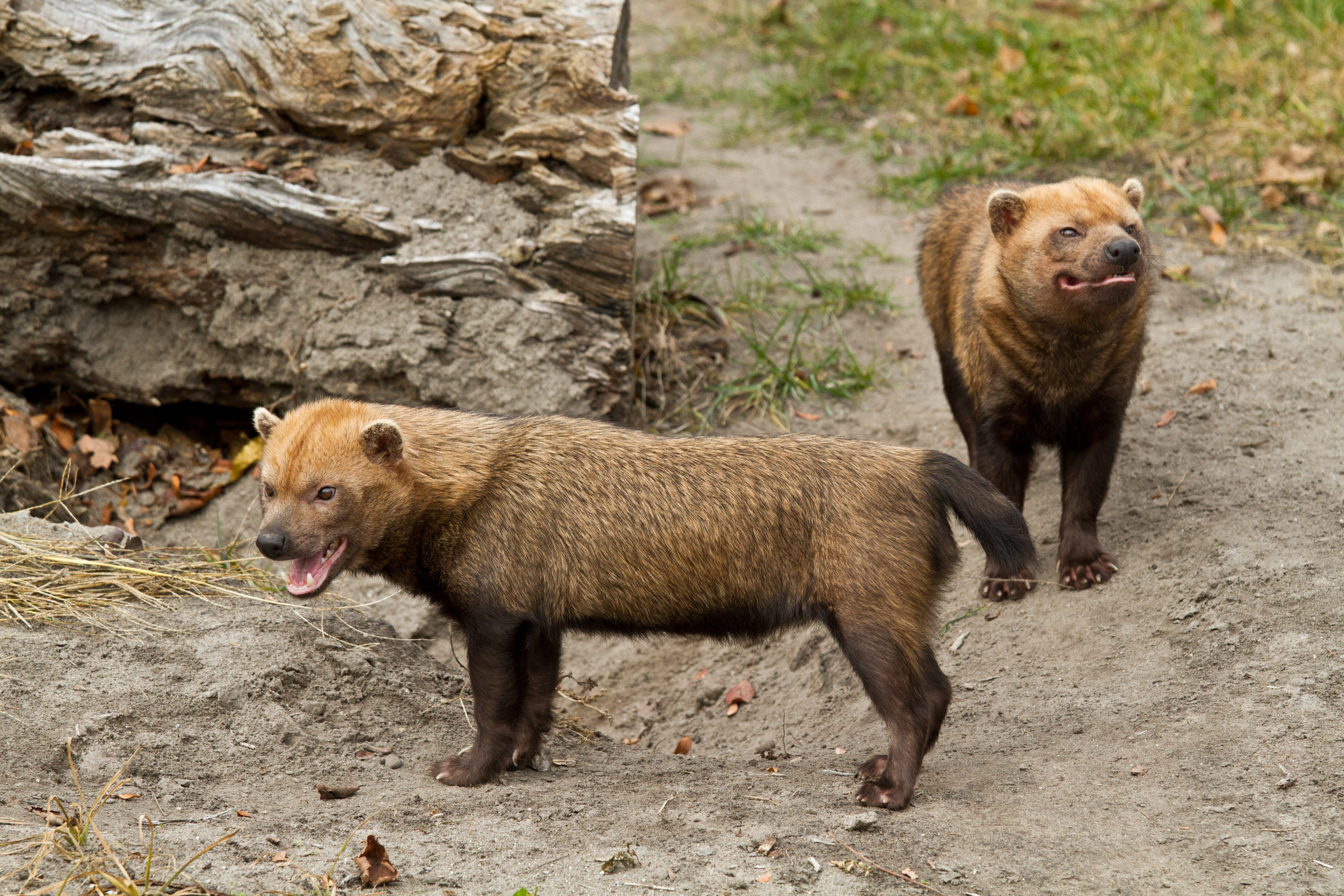
- Bush dogs at Detroit Zoo

Conservation status
- Near Threatened (IUCN 3.1)
- CITES Appendix I

Scientific classification
- Kingdom: Animalia
- Phylum: Chordata
- Class: Mammalia
- Order: Carnivora
- Family: Canidae
- Genus: Speothos
- Species: S. venaticus

Binomial name
- Speothos venaticus (Lund, 1842)

Subspecies
- S. v. panamensis (Panamanian bush dog); S. v. venaticus (South American bush dog); S. v. wingei (southern bush dog)
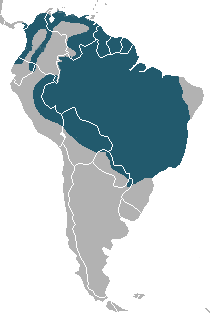
- Bush dog range

= Bush dog =

Species of carnivore

The bush dog (Speothos venaticus) is a canine found in Central and South America. In spite of its extensive range, it is very rare in most areas except in Suriname, Guyana and Peru; it was first described by Peter Wilhelm Lund from fossils in Brazilian caves and was believed to be extinct.

The bush dog is the only extant species in the genus Speothos, and genetic evidence suggests that its closest living relative is the maned wolf of central South America or the African wild dog. The species is listed as Near Threatened by the IUCN.

In Brazil, it is called cachorro-vinagre ('vinegar dog') and cachorro-do-mato ('bush dog'). In Spanish-speaking countries, it is called perro vinagre ('vinegar dog'), zorro vinagre ('vinegar fox'), perro de agua ('water dog'), and perro de monte ('shrub or woodland dog').

== Description ==
Adult bush dogs have soft long brownish-tan fur, with a lighter reddish tinge on the head, neck and back and a bushy tail, while the underside is dark, sometimes with a lighter throat patch. Younger individuals, however, have black fur over their entire bodies. Adults typically have a head-body length of 57–75 cm (22–30 in), with a 12.5–15 cm (5–6 in) tail. They have a shoulder height of 20–30 cm (8–12 in) and weigh 5–8 kg (11–18 lb). They have short legs relative to their body, as well as a short snout and relatively small ears.

The teeth are adapted for its carnivorous habits. Uniquely for an American canid, the dental formula is 3.1.4.13.1.4.2 for a total of 38 teeth. The bush dog is one of three canid species (the other two being the dhole and the African wild dog) with trenchant heel dentition, having a single cusp on the talonid of the lower carnassial tooth that increases the cutting blade length. Females have four pairs of teats and both sexes have large scent glands on either side of the anus. Bush dogs have partially webbed toes, which allow them to swim more efficiently.

=== Genetics ===
Speothos has a diploid chromosome number of 74. This makes it unable to produce fertile hybrids with other canid species.

== Distribution and habitat ==
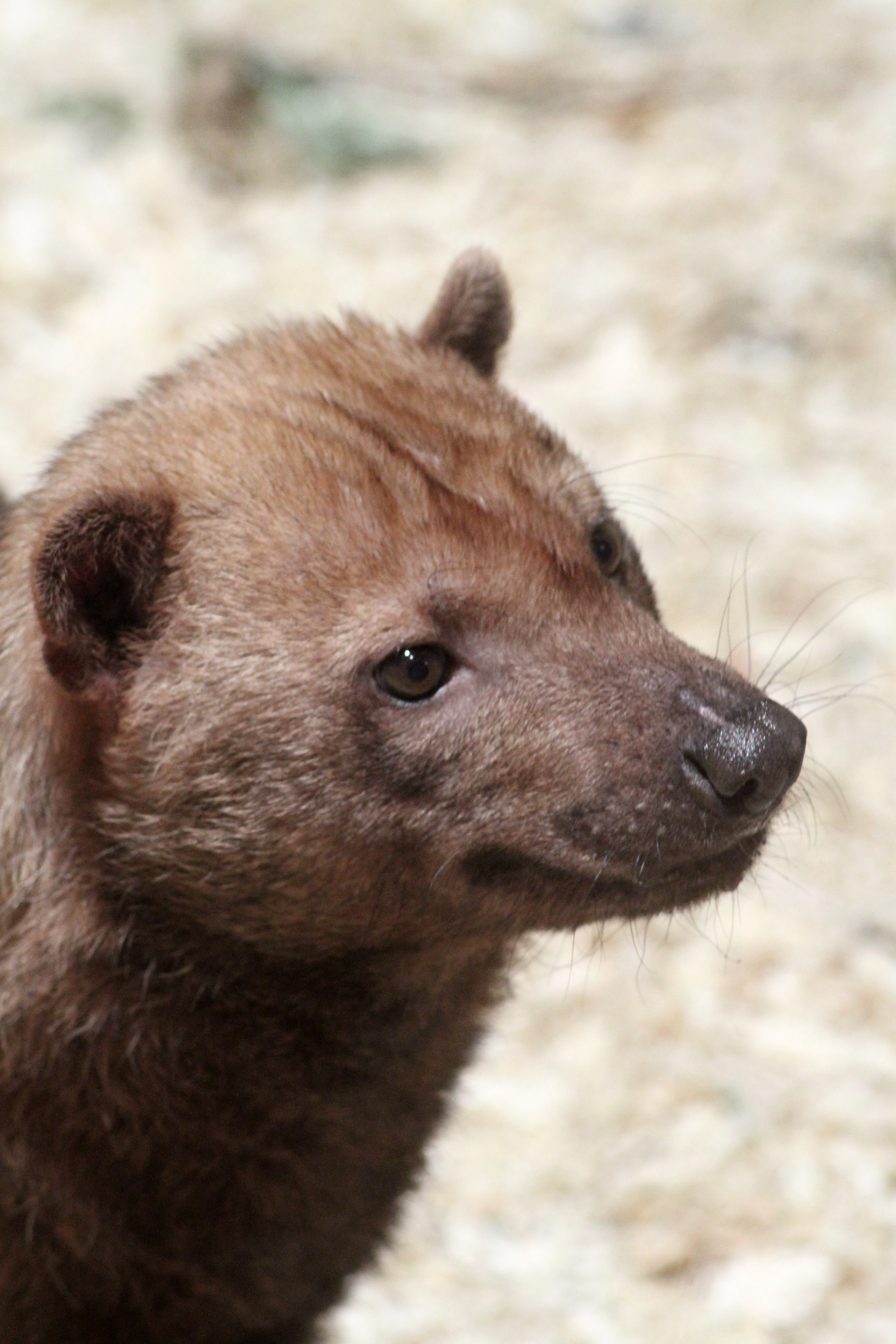
Bush dog

Bush dogs are found from Costa Rica in Central America and through much of South America east of the Andes, as far south as central Bolivia, Paraguay, and southern Brazil. They primarily inhabit lowland forests up to 1,900 metres (6,200 ft) elevation, wet savannas and other habitats near rivers, but may also be found in drier cerrado and open pasture. The historic range of this species may have extended as far north as Costa Rica where the species may still be found in suitable habitat. New, repeated observations of bush dog groups have been recorded in east-central (Barbilla National Park) and south-eastern (La Amistad International Park) Costa Rica, and a substantial portion of the Talamanca Mountains up to 120 km (75 mi) to the north-northwest and at elevations up to 2,119 m (6,952 ft). Very recent fossils dating from 300 AD to 900 AD (the Late Ceramic Age) have been found in the Manzanilla site on the eastern coast of Trinidad.

There are three recognised subspecies:

- The South American bush dog (Speothos venaticus venaticus), with a range including southern Colombia and Venezuela, the Guyanas, most of Brazil, eastern Ecuador and Peru, Bolivia, and northern Paraguay.
- The Panamanian bush dog (Speothos venaticus panamensis), with a range including Panama, northern Colombia and Venezuela, western Ecuador.
- The southern bush dog (Speothos venaticus wingei), with a range including southern Brazil and Paraguay, as well as extreme northeastern Argentina. The first camera trap photos of this species in Argentina were obtained in April 2016 from the Selva Paranaense Don Otto Ecological Private Reserve, located in Eldorado Department of the Misiones province of Argentina.

== Behavior ==
Bush dogs are carnivores and hunt during the day. Their typical prey are pacas, agoutis, acouchis and capybaras, all large rodents. Although they can hunt alone, bush dogs are usually found in small packs. When hunting paca, part of the pack chases it on land and part wait for it in the water, where it often retreats. The dogs can bring down much larger prey, including peccaries and rheas. A pack of six dogs has even been reported hunting a South American tapir for 3 hours, where they bit the prey at its legs until it was felled badly wounded and exhausted; this makes the body mass of the prey at least 21 times greater than that of an individual bush dog, while adult African elephants hunted by lion prides are only 10–15 times larger than an individual lion. Although they can hunt such large prey in groups, bush dogs generally prefer smaller prey that does not pose a high risk of injury; a lone bush dog may suffer broken canine teeth attempting to subdue a paca. A finite element analysis has found that the bush dog generates half the bite force of the grey wolf despite being at least 7 times lighter; in addition, their skull experiences less mechanical stress when animal pulling its head backwards, which is consistent with their reported behaviour of pulling greater long-nosed armadillos out of their burrows and pulling backwards when biting their prey.

Bush dogs appear to be the most gregarious South American canid species. They use hollow logs and cavities such as armadillo burrows for shelter. Packs consist of a single mated pair and their immediate relations, and have a home range of 3.8 to 10 square kilometres (1.5 to 3.9 sq mi). Only the adult pair breed, while the other members of the pack are subordinate, and help with rearing and guarding any pups. Packmates keep in contact with frequent whines, perhaps because visibility is poor in the undergrowth where they typically hunt. While eating large prey, parents position themselves at either ends of the animal, making it easier for the pups to disembowel it.

== Reproduction ==
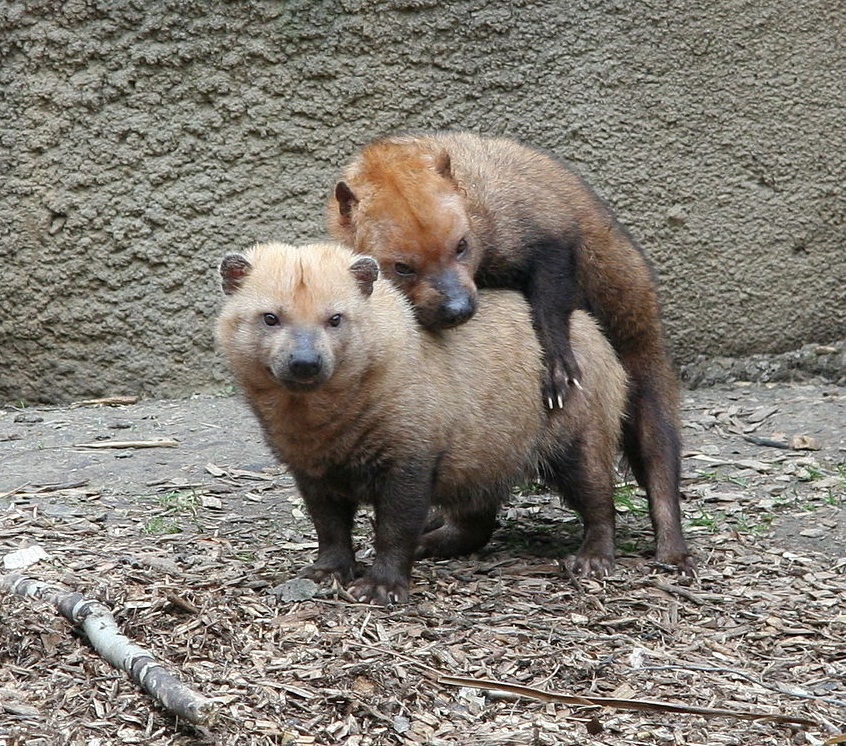
Bush dogs mating

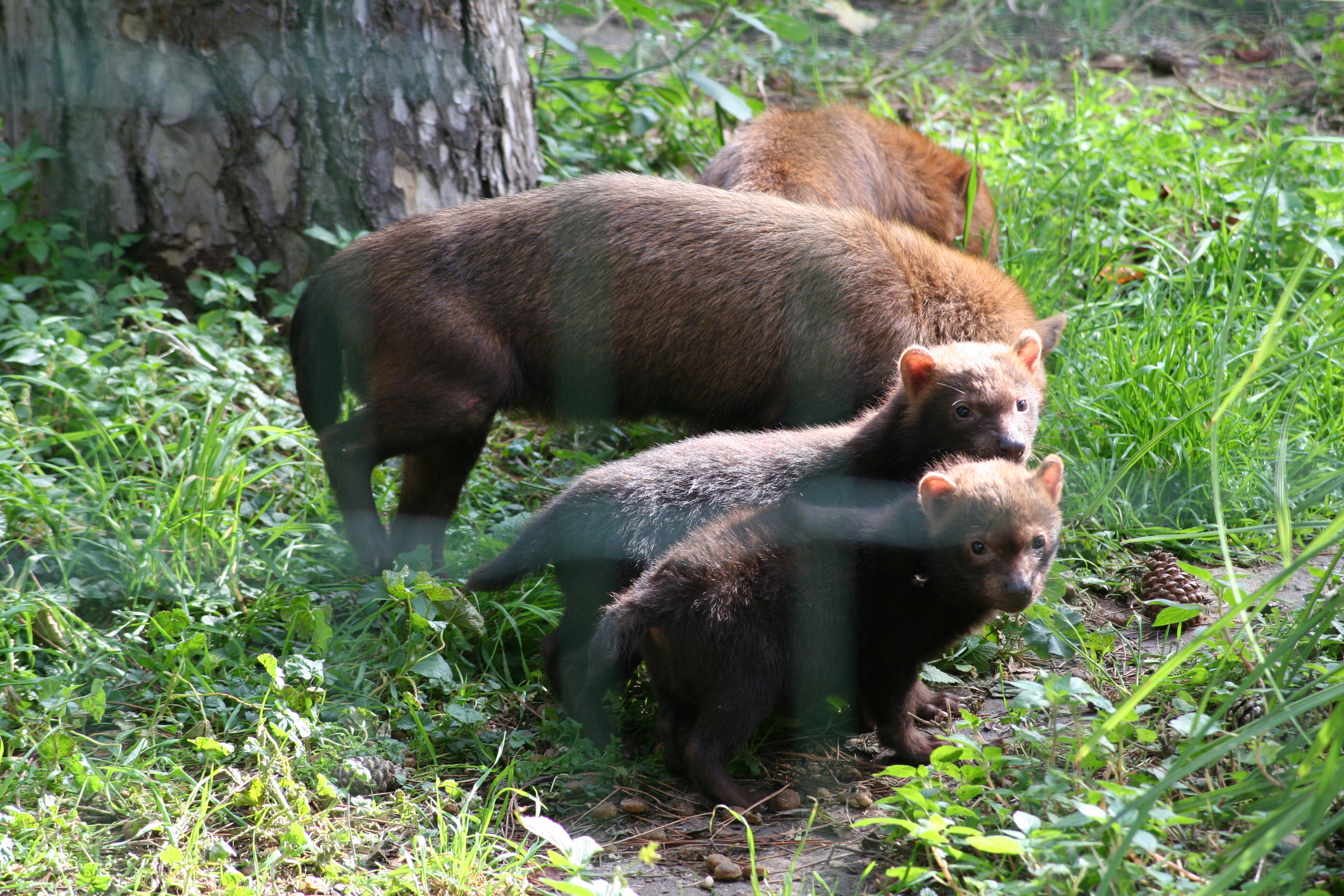
Bush dogs with pups

Bush dogs mate throughout the year; oestrus lasts up to twelve days and occurs every 15 to 44 days. Like many other canids, bush dog mating includes a copulatory tie, during which the animals are locked together. Urine-marking plays a significant role in their pre-copulatory behavior.

Gestation lasts from 65 to 83 days and normally results in the birth of a litter of three to six pups, although larger litters of up to 10 have been reported. The young are born blind and helpless and initially weigh 125 to 190 grams (4.4 to 6.7 oz). The eyes open after 14 to 19 days and the pups first emerge from the nativity den shortly thereafter. The young are weaned at around four weeks and reach sexual maturity at one year. They can live for up to 10 years in captivity.

== Conservation ==
Bush dogs are among the least-studied canines, and their conservation efforts are still in early stages. Due to their rarity, when bush dog bones were discovered in a cave in 1839, paleontologist Peter Wilhelm Lund mistakenly believed they were extinct. Living individuals were later found.

Research shows they are generalists capable of thriving in diverse habitats. However, conservation is challenging due to their dense habitats and sparse, scattered populations, making them difficult to locate. Bush dogs require large, undisturbed territories to support their pack-based lifestyle, and they are notably shy.

The International Union for Conservation of Nature (IUCN) lists bush dogs as Near Threatened due to a population decline of approximately 20–25% over the past 12 years. The main threats include habitat loss (particularly from deforestation for wood, cattle farming, and palm oil production), loss of prey due to human hunting, and diseases contracted from domestic dogs. Habitat loss, especially through Amazonian clear-cutting, is the most significant threat, while disease transmission from unvaccinated domestic dogs has also become a growing concern due to human encroachment.

Hunting bush dogs is illegal in most of their range, including countries like Colombia, Ecuador, Brazil, French Guiana, Paraguay, Peru, Bolivia, Panama, and Argentina. However, Guyana and Suriname lack explicit hunting bans for bush dogs, and many countries in the bush dog's range have limited resources to enforce existing wildlife laws.

To better understand and protect bush dogs, scientists are experimenting with various monitoring methods. Traditional camera traps have proven ineffective due to bush dogs' elusive nature, so researchers are now using scent-detection dogs to locate bush dog burrows. This approach aims to provide valuable insights into their habitat use, prey preferences, and pack dynamics, including when cubs leave the pack. Protected areas such as the Yasuni Biosphere Reserve may support stable populations.

In a positive development, bush dogs were recently captured on camera traps in Costa Rica's Talamanca Mountains in 2020, suggesting they may be expanding their range northward and into higher elevations. This could indicate that with dedicated conservation efforts, bush dogs may stabilize or even increase in numbers.

== Bibliography ==
- Duplaix, Nicole; Simon, Noel (1976). World Guide to Mammals. Crown Publishers / Mandarin Publishers. ISBN 978-0-517-52920-1.
- Flower, William Henry (February 17, 1880). "On the bush-dog (Icticyon venaticus Lund)". Proceedings of the Zoological Society of London. 1880: 70–76 – via Internet Archive.
