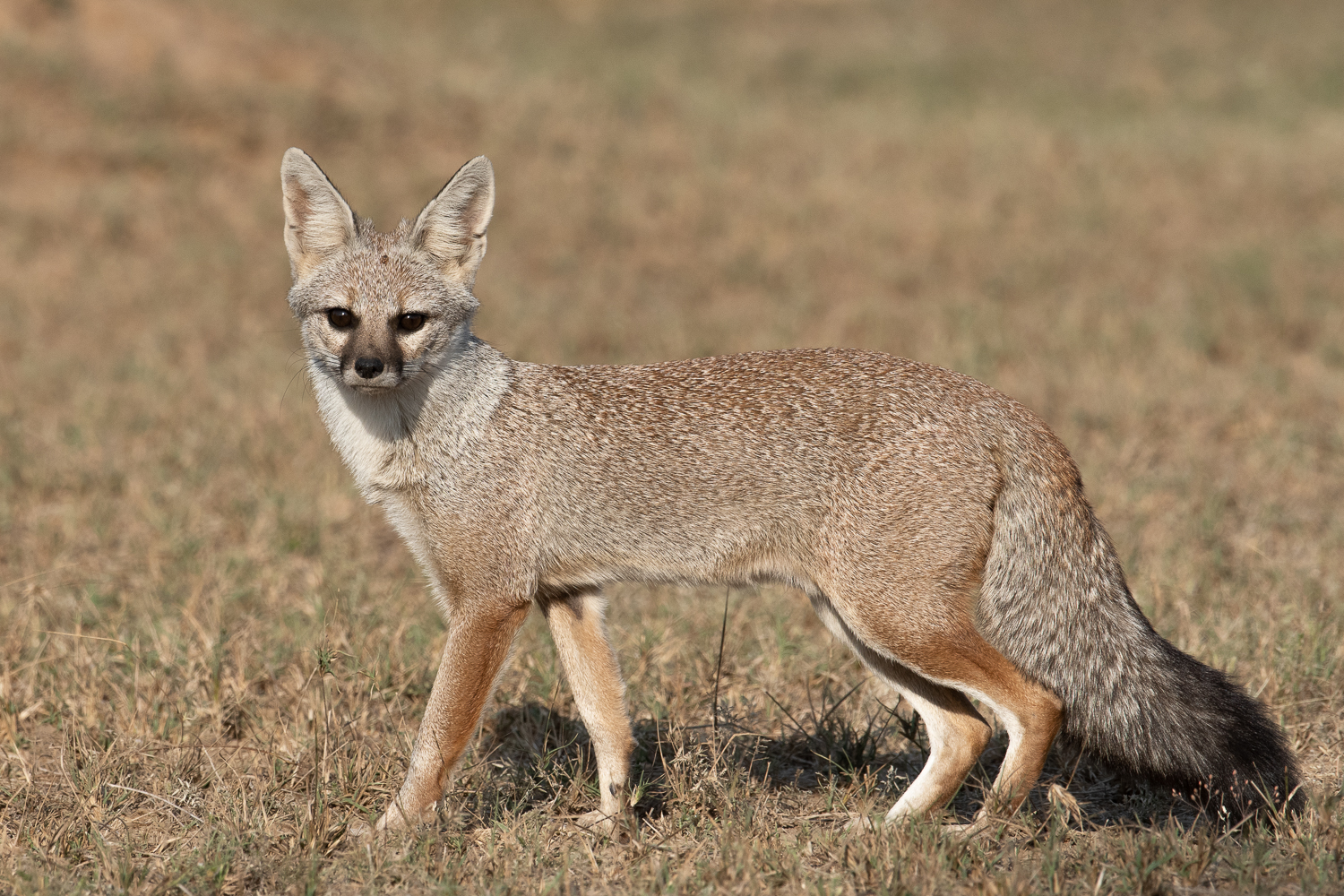
- Bengal fox in Thar Desert, Rajasthan

Conservation status
- Least Concern (IUCN 3.1)
- CITES Appendix III

Scientific classification
- Kingdom: Animalia
- Phylum: Chordata
- Class: Mammalia
- Order: Carnivora
- Family: Canidae
- Genus: Vulpes
- Species: V. bengalensis

Binomial name
- Vulpes bengalensis (Shaw, 1800)
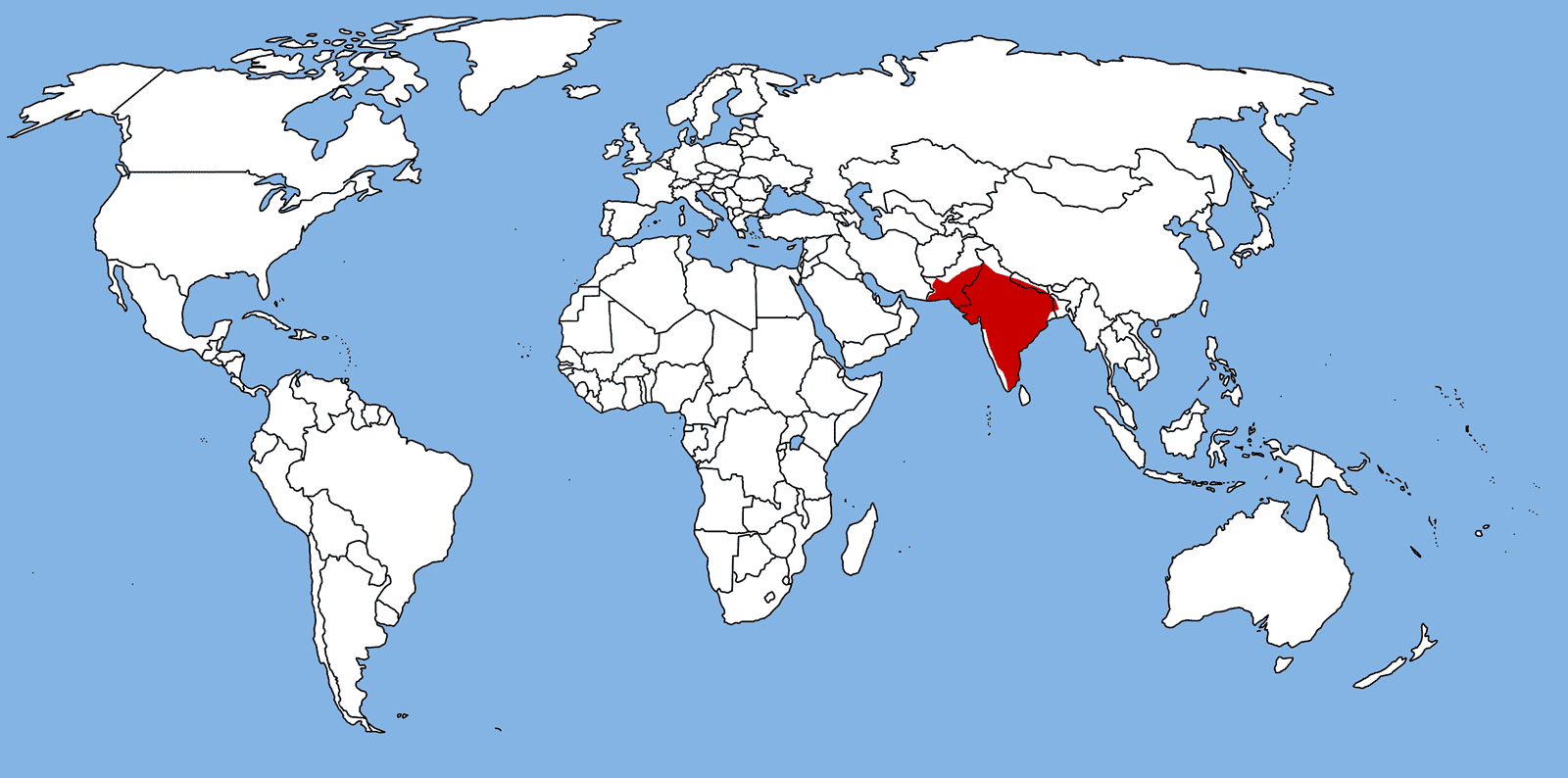
- Range map

Synonyms
- Canis bengalensis; Canis kokree; Canis rufescens; Canis indicus; Canis xanthura; Vulpes kokree; Vulpes rufescens; Vulpes indicus; Vulpes xanthura; Fennecus bengalensis; Fennecus kokree; Fennecus rufescens; Fennecus indicus; Fennecus xanthurus

= Bengal fox =

Species of carnivore

The Bengal fox (Vulpes bengalensis), also known as the Indian fox, is a fox endemic to the Indian subcontinent from the Himalayan foothills and Terai of Nepal through southern India, and from southern and eastern Pakistan to eastern India and southeastern Bangladesh.

== Description ==
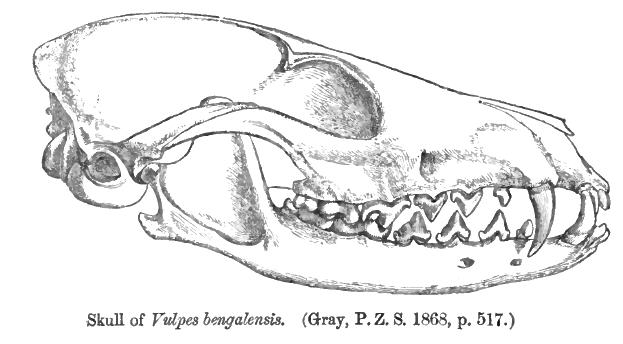
Skull

The Bengal fox is a relatively small fox with an elongated muzzle, long, pointed ears, and a long, bushy tail. The pelage ranges in color from buff to silver-gray with an overall grizzled effect; it is mostly grayish dorsally and paler ventrally. The legs tend to be brownish or rufous, and the underparts light, a pale sand or ginger shade. Extensive variation in coat colour exists across populations and seasonally within populations, but generally the coat is reddish grey above with paler sides and rufous limbs. It has a bushy, black-tipped tail, which is around 50–60% of the length of the head and body. The backs of the ears are dark brown with a black margin; the ears are white inside. The ears have the same colour as the nape or maybe darker. Its rhinarium is naked, and its lips are black. The muzzle is pointy, and there may be a dark smudged marking along the upper part of muzzle in front of eyes. The head and body length for males is 50 cm (20 in), with a 29 cm (11 in) long tail. The head and body length for females is 47 cm (19 in), with a 28 cm (11 in) long tail. Males weigh 2.7 to 3.6 kg (6.0 to 7.9 lb) and females weigh under 1.8 kg (4.0 lb).

Members of the genus Vulpes have a flat forehead between the postorbital processes, not inflated by air cells. The processes themselves are slightly concave with a raised anterior edge. The canine teeth are longer than in other canid species.

== Distribution and habitat ==
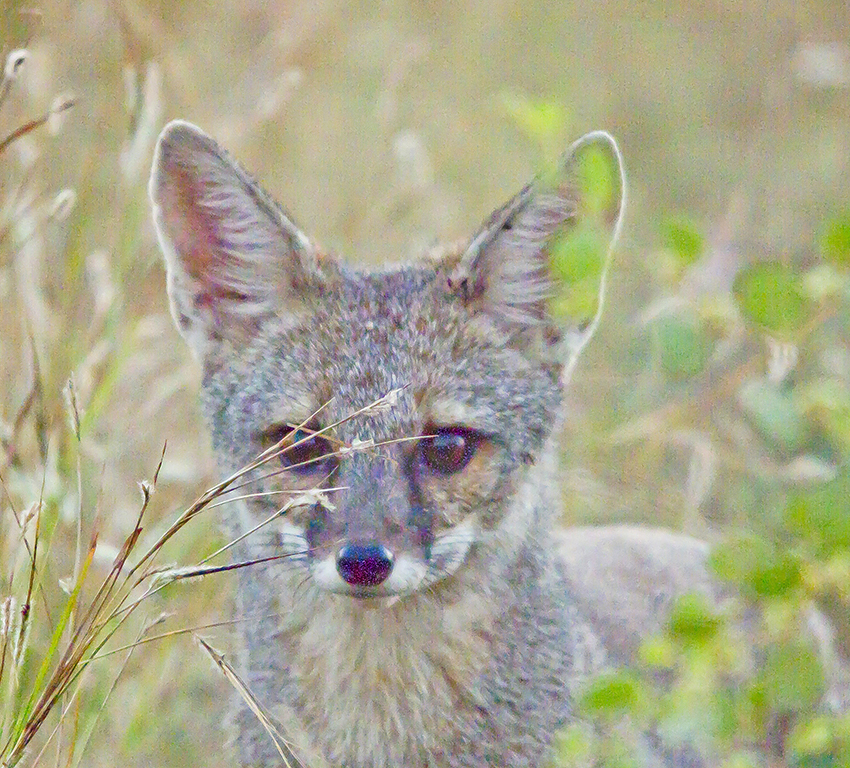
Bengal fox at Rajkot

The Bengal fox is endemic to the Indian subcontinent, ranging from the Himalayan foothills and Terai of Nepal through Southern India, and from southern and eastern Pakistan to eastern India and southeastern Bangladesh. Its range is bounded by the Himalayas and the Indus River valley. It favors semiarid, flat to undulating land, bush and short grassland habitats. It avoids dense forests, steep terrain, tall grasslands and true deserts.

Historical records indicate that the Bengal fox was spotted in the southeastern regions of Cumilla and Chattogram during the 1980s; however, over time, no further sightings have been reported in these areas, suggesting its possible local extinction. It is relatively widespread in low rainfall areas where the vegetation is usually scrub, thorn or dry deciduous forests, or short grasslands. In the Indian peninsula, the species is confined to plains and open scrub forests. It was considered to be a habitat generalist, but it shows a strong preference for semiarid, short grassland habitats at multiple scales.

== Behaviour and ecology ==
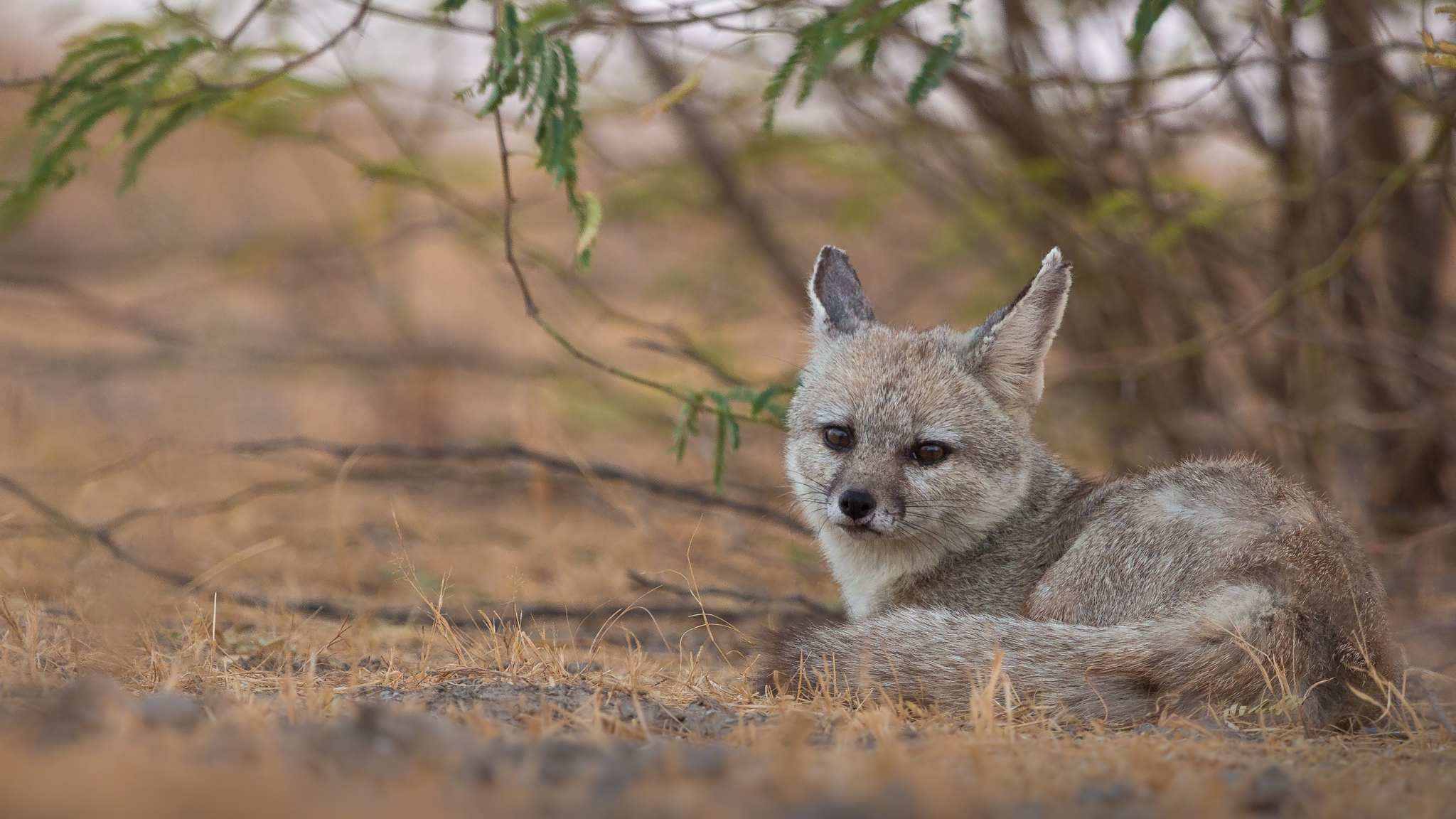
Female Bengal fox at den site in the Little Rann of Kutch

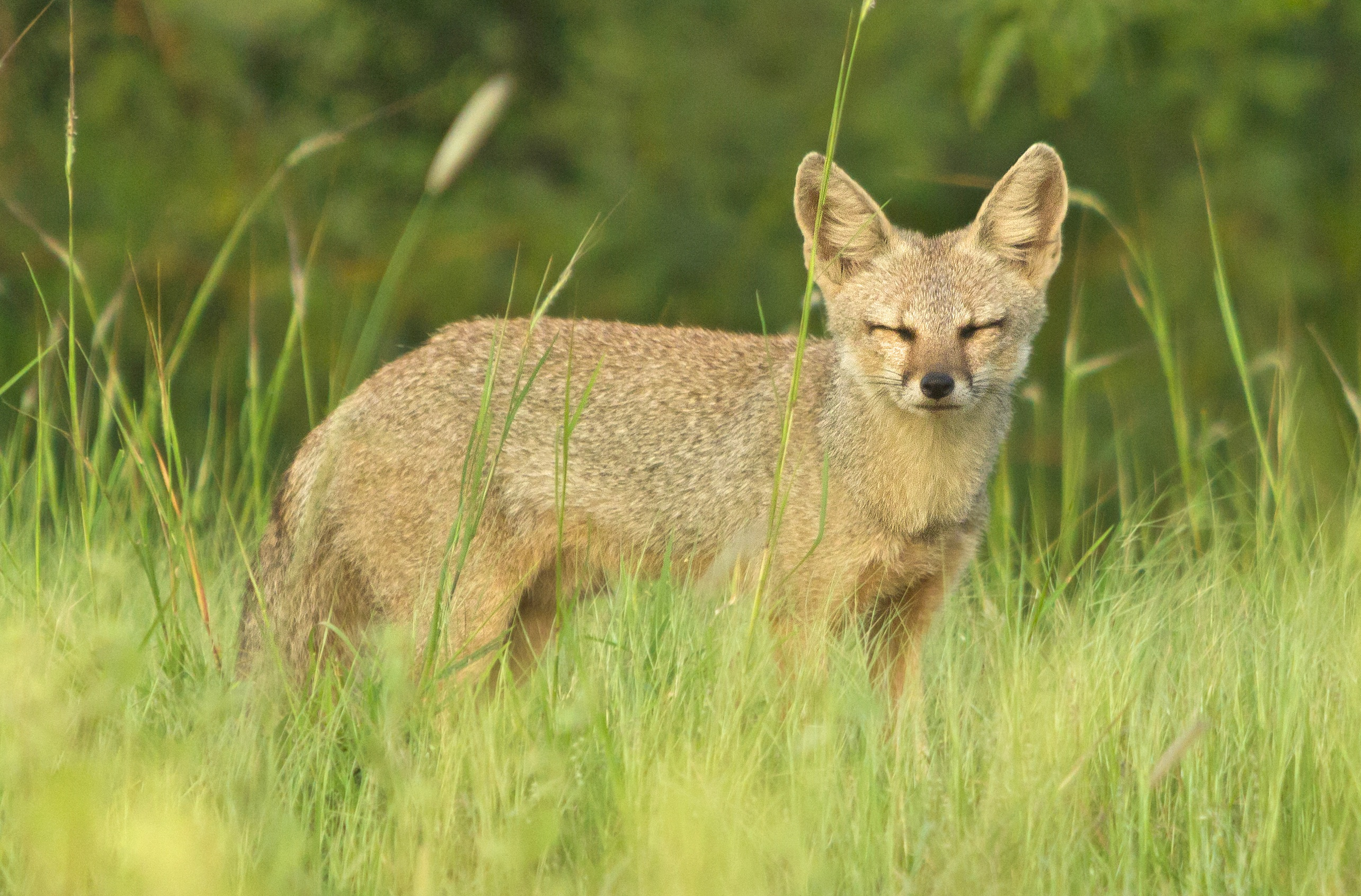
Male Bengal fox

Bengal foxes are predominantly crepuscular and nocturnal; while individuals may sometimes become active during cool periods of daytime, they typically spend warmer daylight hours under vegetation or in subterranean dens. They use three distinct types of den: basic, compact dens with two openings used for short rest periods, complex dens with multiple openings, and dens under rocks or rock crevices. The basic social unit of the Bengal fox is the breeding pair, formed by a pair of bonds that can last for many years. Larger aggregations may occur while grown pups linger longer than average in the natal community. Other findings indicate that Bengal foxes can sometimes be more social. Female Bengal foxes were reported to share dens during lactation and four adult foxes were seen emerging from the same den.

Bengal foxes are not especially suspicious of humans and can be found near human habitation. They are easy to tame.

=== Diet ===
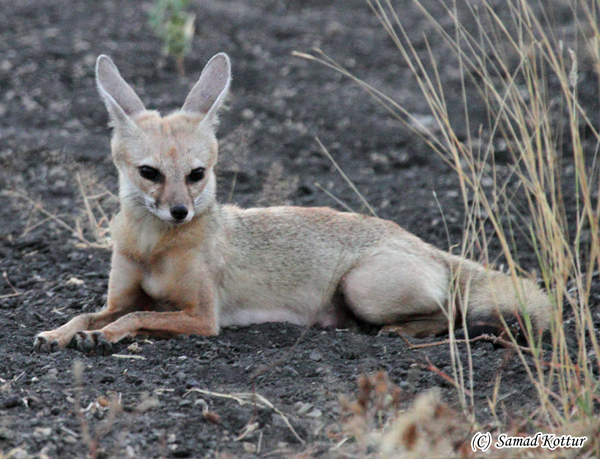
Bengal fox

Bengal foxes are omnivorous and opportunistic feeders, feeding primarily on insects, small mammals, reptiles, small birds, and fruits. Its diet consists mainly of orthopterans, termites, ants, beetles, spiders, soft-furred rat (Millardia meltada), little Indian field mouse (Mus booduga), Indian gerbil (Tatera indica), Indian mynah (Acridotheres tristis), grey partridge (Francolinus ponticerianus) and ashy-crowned finch lark (Eremopterix griseus). Less common prey items include ground lizards, oriental rat snake (Ptyas mucosa), Madras hedgehog (Paraechinus nudiventris) and Indian hare (Lepus nigricollis). They feed on fruits of ber (Ziziphus mauritiana), neem (Azadirachta indica), mango (Mangifera indica), jambu (Syzygium cumini) and banyan (Ficus benghalensis). The Bengal fox is also considered to be a predator of eggs and possibly bustard chicks. Scats of young pups indicated that they primarily feed on rodents.

=== Communication ===
Bengal foxes make a wide range of vocalizations. A common vocalization is a "chattering cry" that seems to have a significant role in establishing territoriality and may also be used as a warning call. They also growl, whimper, whine and make a sound which could be called a growl-bark. In reaction to humans, yapping or baying has also been observed. The Bengal fox does not appear to have latrine behaviour, a feature seen in some social canids, in which all members defecate at specific spots. They can be heard howling in the night in groups.

=== Reproduction ===
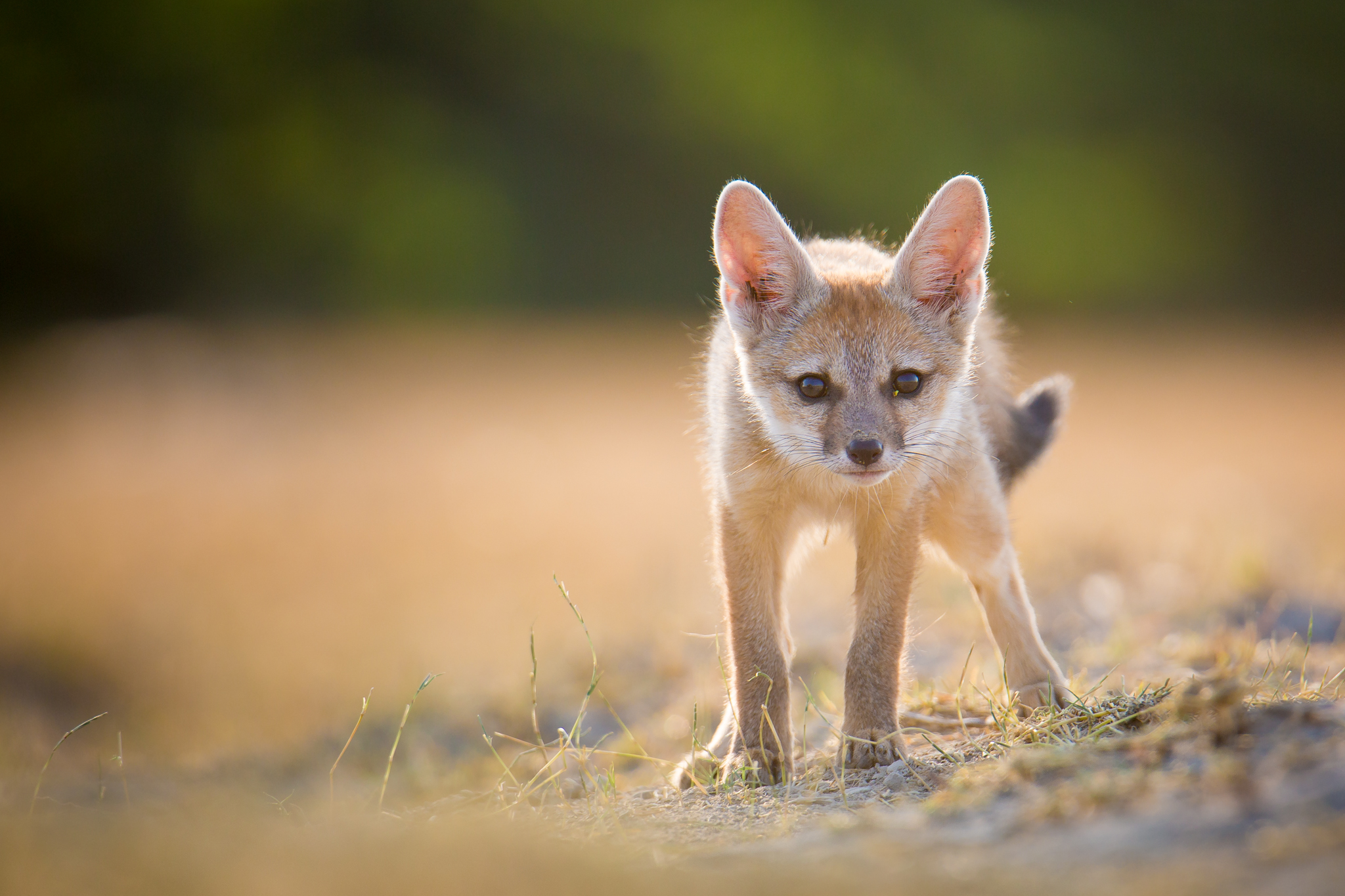
2– to 3–week–old pup at the Little Rann of Kutch

During the breeding season, males vocalize intensely during the night and at dusk and dawn. Throughout most of its range, the mating season occurs in December to January and after a gestation period of around 50–53 days, two to four pups are born in a den. Both parents participate in pup-rearing and protection. Aggregations of grown foxes at den sites have been recorded when the dispersal has been delayed, although the presence of helpers has not been observed. Pups may sometimes be nursed by multiple females, but the relationship between them is uncertain.

During the day, they tend to rest under shrubs and bushes, except in summer when they rest in dens. Play between pups is typical during the first 3 months and consists of vertical jumps, back arching, foreleg stabs, submissive displays, and play solicitation; the adult male sometimes plays with the young. In northwestern India, young foxes are scattered during the monsoon season, when the opportunities are plentiful. The pups are fully weaned about 3–4 months after emerging from the den. Pup mortality is high during the first few months.

== Threats ==
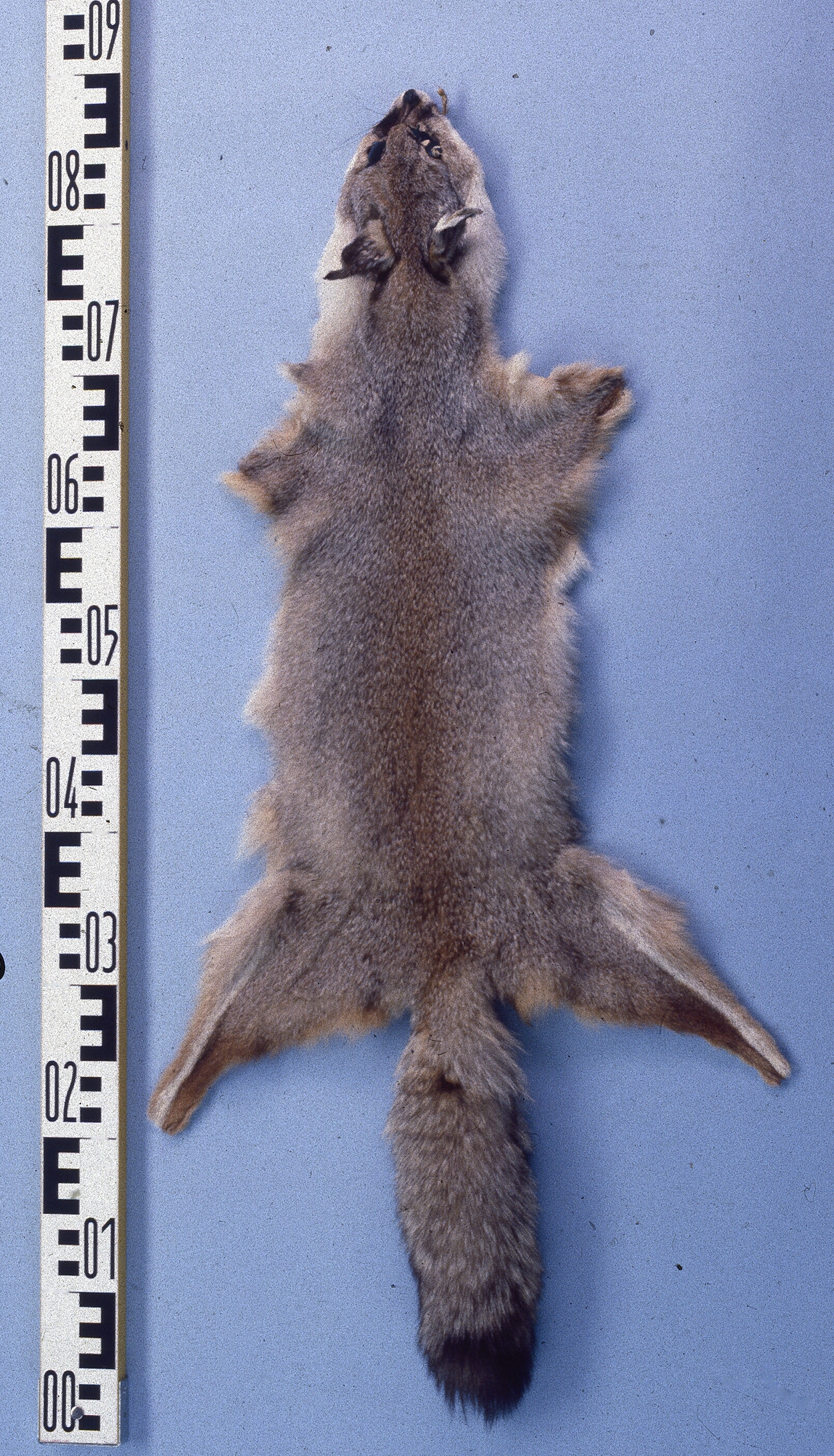
Bengal fox pelt

Lack of habitat protection is perhaps the greatest threat to the Bengal fox. In southern India, less than 2% of potential Bengal fox habitat is covered under the existing protected area network of the states of Karnataka and Andhra Pradesh . It can tolerate human disruptions, but with the increase in human populations and the increased conversion of grasslands for agricultural and industrial use, the habitat of the Bengal fox is continually being reduced. The combination of the above causes, combined with disease and natural mortality, could potentially cause localized extirpation. Hunting for its skin and flesh, as well as conversion of its grassland habitat to agriculture, industry, and increasingly bio-fuel plantations, have affected its population density. In addition, its body parts are used in traditional medicine, and in some areas it is eaten. It is hunted by the narikuruva tribes of southern India. In Karnataka, it is captured in rituals conducted during Sankranthi.

The Bengal fox usually occurs at low densities across its range. Populations may fluctuate significantly depending on prey abundance and disease, such as canine distemper virus and rabies, both of which have caused local population declines in western India.

== Conservation ==
The populations of India are listed on CITES Appendix III. The Indian Wildlife Conservation Act (1972 as amended to 2005) forbids the hunting of all wildlife and lists the Bengal fox in Schedule II. It does not apply to any particular category in the wildlife protection legislation of Nepal. It is listed as least concern in the IUCN Red List of Threatened Species.
