= List of birds of Qatar =

This is a list of the bird species recorded in Qatar. The avifauna of Qatar include a total of 352 species, of which 3 have been introduced by humans.

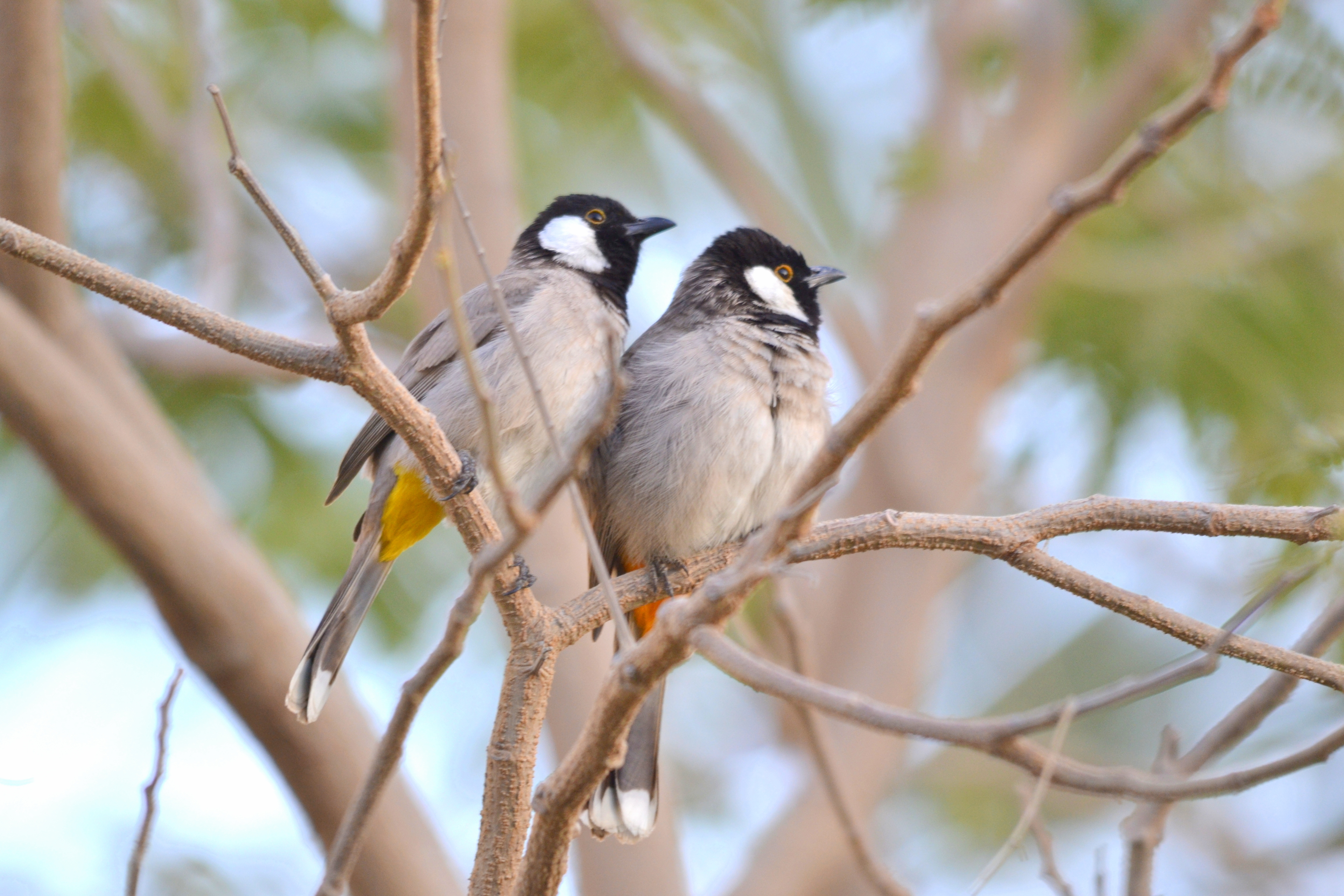
A pair of white-eared bulbuls (Pycnonotus leucotis) observed in the country

This list's taxonomic treatment (designation and sequence of orders, families and species) and nomenclature (common and scientific names) follow the conventions of The Clements Checklist of Birds of the World, 2022 edition. The family accounts at the beginning of each heading reflect this taxonomy, as do the species counts found in each family account. Introduced and accidental species are included in the total counts for Qatar. Native species are marked with an "N". The global conservation status are displayed per the IUCN for each species alongside the population trend. The Qatar birds list, which has catalogued all verified species recorded in the country serves as the primary source for the list.

Additionally, the book Common birds of Qatar covering 215 of the total 352 species in the country has been used to depict the species' frequency in the country, as well as habitat.

The following tags have been used to highlight several categories. The commonly occurring native species do not fall into any of these categories.

- (A) Accidental – a species that accidentally occurs in Qatar, and is not a regular migrant nor a resident.
- (R) Rare – a species that is a regular visitor or inhabitant of the country, but in very small or sparse populations. Most species marked as such are threatened.
- (I) Introduced – a species introduced to Qatar as a consequence, direct or indirect, of human actions. Due to Qatar's harsh and generally resistant environment, none of the introduced species listed are considered invasive in the country.
- (Ex) Extirpated – a species that no longer occurs in Qatar although populations exist elsewhere
- (X) Extinct – a species or subspecies that no longer exists

== Ostriches ==
Order: Struthioniformes Family: Struthionidae

The ostrich is a flightless bird native to Africa. It is the largest living species of bird. It is distinctive in its appearance, with a long neck and legs and the ability to run at high speeds.

Common name	Trinomial name	Status in the country	Global status	Trend	Notes	Image
Arabian ostrich	Struthio camelus ssp. syriacus	X	Extinct	N/A	Formerly widespread in the Arabian peninsula	
Red-necked ostrich	Struthio camelus ssp. camelus	I	Critically endangered	▼	Found in Ras Abrouq, west coast	

== Ducks, geese, and waterfowl ==
Order: Anseriformes Family: Anatidae

Anatidae includes the ducks and most duck-like waterfowl, such as geese and swans. These birds are adapted to an aquatic existence with webbed feet, flattened bills, and feathers that are excellent at shedding water due to an oily coating.

Common name	Binomial name	Status in the country	Global status	Trend	Notes	Image
Graylag goose	Anser anser	N	Least concern	▲	Rare winter visitor	
Greater white-fronted goose	Anser albifrons	A	Least concern	?	Rare winter visitor	
Whooper swan	Cygnus cygnus	A	Least concern	?	Vagrant	
Egyptian goose	Alopochen aegyptiaca	I	Least concern	▼	Introduced	
Ruddy shelduck	Tadorna ferruginea	A	Least concern	?	Scarce winter visitor	
Common shelduck	Tadorna tadorna	N	Least concern	▲	Scarce winter visitor	
Cotton pygmy-goose	Nettapus coromandelianus	A	Least concern	Steady	vagrant	
Garganey	Spatula querquedula	N	Least concern	▼	Passage migrant and winter visitor	
Northern shoveler	Spatula clypeata	N	Least concern	▼	winter visitor	
Gadwall	Mareca strepera	A	Least concern	▲	Scarce winter visitor	
Eurasian wigeon	Mareca penelope	N	Least concern	▼	winter visitor	
Mallard	Anas platyrhynchos	N	Least concern	▲	Common winter visitor	
Northern pintail	Anas acuta	N	Least concern	▼	Winter visitor	
Green-winged teal	Anas crecca	N	Least concern	?	Winter visitor	
Marbled teal	Marmaronetta angustirostris	R	Vulnerable	▼	Vagrant recorded in 1985	
Red-crested pochard	Netta rufina	A	Least concern	?	Vagrant	
Common pochard	Aythya ferina	R	Vulnerable	▼	Overwintering	
Ferruginous duck	Aythya nyroca	N	Near threatened	▼	Scarce resident	
Tufted duck	Aythya fuligula	N	Least concern	Steady	Common winter visitor in greywater and lagoons	
Long-tailed duck	Clangula hyemalis	R	Vulnerable	▼	Vagrant.	

== Guineafowl ==
Order: Galliformes Family: Numididae

Guineafowl are a group of African, seed-eating, ground-nesting birds which resemble partridges, but with featherless heads and spangled grey plumage.

Common name	Binomial name	Status in the country	Global status	Trend	Notes	Image
Vulturine guineafowl	Acryllium vulturinum	A	Least concern	Steady	Vagrant	

== Pheasants, grouse, and allies ==
Order: Galliformes Family: Phasianidae

The Phasianidae are a family of terrestrial birds which consists of quails, partridges, snowcocks, francolins, spurfowls, tragopans, monals, pheasants, peafowls and jungle fowls. In general, they are plump (although they vary in size) and have broad, relatively short wings.

Common name	Binomial name	Status in the country	Global status	Trend	Notes	Image
Gray francolin	Francolinus pondicerianus	I	Least concern	Steady	Introduced and established; resident	
Common quail	Coturnix coturnix	N	Least concern	▼	Passage migrant	

== Flamingos ==
Order: Phoenicopteriformes Family: Phoenicopteridae

Flamingos are gregarious wading birds, usually 3 to 5 feet (0.9 to 1.5 m) tall, found in both the Western and Eastern Hemispheres. Flamingos filter-feed on shellfish and algae. Their oddly shaped beaks are specially adapted to separate mud and silt from the food they consume and, uniquely, are used upside-down.

Common name	Binomial name	Status in the country	Global status	Trend	Notes	Image
Greater flamingo	Phoenicopterus roseus	N	Least concern	▲	Resident breeder	
Lesser flamingo	Phoenicopterus minor	A	Near threatened	▼	Vagrant recorded in 2013	

== Grebes ==
Order: Podicipediformes Family: Podicipedidae

Grebes are small to medium-large freshwater diving birds. They have lobed toes and are excellent swimmers and divers. However, they have their feet placed far back on the body, making them quite ungainly on land.

Common name	Binomial name	Status in the country	Global status	Trend	Notes	Image
Little grebe	Tachybaptus ruficollis	N	Least concern	▼	Resident	
Great crested grebe	Podiceps cristatus	N	Least concern	?	Resident	
Eared grebe	Podiceps nigricolis	N	Least concern	?	Winter visitor	

== Pigeons and doves ==
Order: Columbiformes Family: Columbidae

Pigeons and doves are stout-bodied birds with short necks and short slender bills with a fleshy cere.

Common name	Binomial name	Status in the country	Global status	Trend	Notes	Image
Rock dove (and domestic variants)	Columba livia	N	Least concern	▼	Domestic variants common everywhere, wild rock doves may be found near the coast	
Stock dove	Columba oenas	A	Least concern	▲	Vagrant recorded in 2019	
European turtle-dove	Streptopelia turtur	R	Vulnerable	▼	Passage migrant	
Oriental turtle dove	Streptopelia decocto	A	Least concern	Steady	Vagrant recorded in 2022	
Eurasian collared-dove	Streptopelia decocto	N	Least concern	▲	Common	
African collared-dove	Streptopelia roseogrisea	A	Least concern	?	Vagrant	
Laughing dove	Streptopelia senegalensis	N	Least concern	Steady	Common	
Namaqua dove	Oena capensis	I	Least concern	▲	Naturally established resident due to its nomadic nature	
Zebra dove	Geopelia striata	I	Least concern	Steady	Introduced in the northeast; small breeding population	

== Sandgrouse ==
Order: Pterocliformes Family: Pteroclidae

Sandgrouse have small, pigeon like heads and necks, but sturdy compact bodies. They have long pointed wings and sometimes tails and a fast direct flight. Flocks fly to watering holes at dawn and dusk. Their legs are feathered down to the toes.

Common name	Binomial name	Status in the country	Global Status	Trend	Notes	Image
Pin-tailed sandgrouse	Pterocles alchata	A	Least concern	Steady	Localised breeder	
Chestnut-bellied sandgrouse	Pterocles exustus	A	Least concern	Steady	Rare	
Crowned sandgrouse	Pterocles coronatus	A	Least concern	Steady	Vagrant	

== Bustards ==
Order: Otidiformes Family: Otididae

Bustards are large terrestrial birds mainly associated with dry open country and steppes in the Old World. They are omnivorous and nest on the ground. They walk steadily on strong legs and big toes, pecking for food as they go. They have long broad wings with "fingered" wingtips and striking patterns in flight. Many have interesting mating displays.

Common name	Binomial name	Status in the country	Global status	Trend	Notes	Image
MacQueen's bustard	Chlamydotis macqueenii	Ex	Vulnerable	▼	May have been extirpated from the country due to overhunting, records nowadays generally considered captive or escaped	

== Cuckoos ==
Order: Cuculiformes Family: Cuculidae

The family Cuculidae includes cuckoos, roadrunners and anis. These birds are of variable size with slender bodies, long tails and strong legs. The Old World cuckoos are brood parasites.

Common name	Binomial name	Status in the country	Global status	Trend	Notes	Image
Great spotted cuckoo	Clamator glandarius	A	Least concern	Steady	Rare	
Pied cuckoo	Clamator jacobinus	A	Least concern	Steady	Vagrant	
Asian koel	Eudynamys scolopaceus	A	Least concern	Steady	Vagrant	
Common cuckoo	Cuculus canorus	N	Least concern	▼	Passage migrant	

== Nightjars and allies ==
Order: Caprimulgiformes Family: Caprimulgidae

Nightjars are medium-sized nocturnal birds that usually nest on the ground. They have long wings, short legs and very short bills. Most have small feet, of little use for walking, and long pointed wings. Their soft plumage is camouflaged to resemble bark or leaves.

Common name	Binomial name	Status in the country	Global Status	Trend	Notes	Image
Eurasian nightjar	Caprimulgus europaeus	N	Least concern	▼	Passage migrant	
Egyptian nightjar	Caprimulgus aegyptius	R	Least concern	▼	Rare passage migrant	

== Swifts ==
Order: Caprimulgiformes Family: Apodidae

Swifts are small birds which spend the majority of their lives flying. These birds have very short legs and never settle voluntarily on the ground, perching instead only on vertical surfaces. Many swifts have long swept-back wings which resemble a crescent or boomerang.

Common name	Binomial name	Status in the country	Global status	Trend	Notes	Image
Alpine swift	Tachymarptis melba	R	Least concern	Steady	vagrant with 4 records	
Common swift	Apus apus	N	Least concern	Steady	Uncommon winter visitor	
Pallid swift	Apus pallidus	N	Least concern	Steady	Winter visitor	
Little swift	Apus affinis	A	Least concern	▲	Vagrant	

== Rails, gallinules, and coots ==
Order: Gruiformes Family: Rallidae

Rallidae is a large family of small to medium-sized birds which includes the rails, crakes, coots and gallinules. Typically they inhabit dense vegetation in damp environments near lakes, swamps or rivers. In general they are shy and secretive birds, making them difficult to observe. Most species have strong legs and long toes which are well adapted to soft uneven surfaces. They tend to have short, rounded wings and to be weak fliers.

Common name	Binomial name	Status in the country	Global status	Trend	Notes	Image
Water rail	Rallus aquaticus	R	Least concern	▼	Winter visitor.	
Corncrake	Crex crex	R	Least concern	Steady	rare passage migrant	
Spotted crake	Porzana porzana	N	Least concern	Steady	uncommon passage migrant	
Eurasian moorhen	Gallinula chloropus	N	Least concern	Steady	Common	
Eurasian coot	Fulica atra	N	Least concern	▲	Resident and winter visitor	
African swamphen	Porphyrio madagascarensis	I	Not recognised by the IUCN	▼	Introduced.	
Grey-headed swamphen	Porphyrio poliocephalus	N	Not recognised by the IUCN	?	Resident	
White-breasted waterhen	Amaurornis phoenicurus	A	Least concern	?	Vagrant	
Little crake	Porzana parva	A	Least concern	Steady	Vagrant	
Baillon's crake	Zapornia pusilla	A	Least concern	?	Vagrant	

== Cranes ==
Order: Gruiformes Family: Gruidae

Cranes are large, long-legged and long-necked birds. Unlike the similar-looking but unrelated herons, cranes fly with necks outstretched, not pulled back. Most have elaborate and noisy courting displays or "dances".

Common name	Binomial name	Status in the country	Global status	Trend	Notes	Image
Common crane	Grus grus	A	Least concern	▲	Vagrant	

== Thick-knees ==
Order: Charadriiformes Family: Burhinidae

The thick-knees are a group of largely tropical waders in the family Burhinidae. They are found worldwide within the tropical zone, with some species also breeding in temperate Europe and Australia. They are medium to large waders with strong black or yellow-black bills, large yellow eyes and cryptic plumage. Despite being classed as waders, most species have a preference for arid or semi-arid habitats.

Common name	Binomial name	Status in the country	Global status	Trend	Notes	Image
Eurasian thick-knee	Burhinus oedicnemus	N	Least concern	▼	Passage migrant	

== Stilts and avocets ==
Order: Charadriiformes Family: Recurvirostridae

Recurvirostridae is a family of large wading birds, which includes the avocets and stilts. The avocets have long legs and long up-curved bills. The stilts have extremely long legs and long, thin, straight bills.

Common name	Binomial name	Status in the country	Global status	Trend	Notes	Image
Black-winged stilt	Himantopus himantopus	N	Least concern	▲	Common	
Pied avocet	Recurvirostra avosetta	N	Least concern	?	Common in winter	

== Oystercatchers ==
Order: Charadriiformes Family: Haematopodidae

The oystercatchers are large and noisy plover-like birds, with strong bills used for smashing or prising open molluscs.

Common name	Binomial name	Status in the country	Global Status	Trend	Notes	Image
Eurasian oystercatcher	Haematopus ostralegus	N	Near threatened	▼	Passage migrant	

== Plovers and lapwings ==
Order: Charadriiformes Family: Charadriidae

The family Charadriidae includes the plovers, dotterels and lapwings. They are small to medium-sized birds with compact bodies, short, thick necks and long, usually pointed, wings. They are found in open country worldwide, mostly in habitats near water. water.

Common name	Binomial name	Status in the country	Global status	Trend	Frequency	Image
Black-bellied plover	Pluvialis squatarola	N	Least concern	▼	Common, found on coasts and shores	
European golden-plover	Pluvialis apricaria	R	Least concern	▲	Vagrant with 5 records	
Pacific golden-plover	Pluvialis fulva	N	Least concern	▼	Scarce passage migrant	
Northern lapwing	Vanellus vanellus	N	Near threatened	▼	Winter visitor	
Spur-winged lapwing	Vanellus spinosus	R	Least concern	▲	Rare passage migrant; breeding in 2023	
Red-wattled lapwing	Vanellus indicus	N	Least concern	?	Scarce breeding resident	
Sociable lapwing	Vanellus gregarius	R	Critically endangered	▼	Rare localised winter visitor	
White-tailed lapwing	Vanellus leucurus	R	Least concern	?	Winter visitor	
Tibetan sand plover	Eupoda atrifrons	N	Least concern	?	Common year-round	
Greater sand plover	Eupoda leschenaultii	N	Least concern	▼	Common year-round	
Caspian plover	Eupoda asiatica	N	Least concern	▼	scarce passage migrant	
Kentish plover	Ochthodromus alexandrinus	N	Least concern	▼	Resident breeder	
Kittlitz's plover	Ochthodromus pecuarius	A	Least concern	?	Vagrant recorded in 2023	
Greater ringed plover	Charadrius hiaticula	N	Least concern	▼	Common winter visitor	
Little ringed plover	Thinornis dubius	N	Least concern	?	Breeding, leaves the country in winter	
Eurasian dotterel	Eudromias morinellus	A	Least concern	▼	Vagrant	

== Painted-snipes ==
Order: Charadriiformes Family: Rostratulidae

Painted-snipes are short-legged, long-billed birds similar in shape to the true snipes, but more brightly coloured.

Common name	Binomial name	Status in the country	Global status	Trend	Notes	Image
Greater painted-snipe	Rostratula benghalensis	A	Least concern	▼	Vagrant	

== Jacanas ==
Order: Charadriiformes Family: Jacanidae

The jacanas are a group of tropical waders in the family Jacanidae. They are found throughout the tropics. They are identifiable by their huge feet and claws which enable them to walk on floating vegetation in the shallow lakes that are their preferred habitat.

Common name	Binomial name	Status in the country	Global status	Trend	Frequency	Image
Pheasant-tailed jacana	Hydrophasianus chirurgus	A	Least concern	▼	Vagrant	

== Sandpipers and allies ==
Order: Charadriiformes Family: Scolopacidae

Scolopacidae is a large diverse family of small to medium-sized shorebirds including the sandpipers, curlews, godwits, shanks, tattlers, woodcocks, snipes, dowitchers and phalaropes. The majority of these species eat small invertebrates picked out of the mud or soil. Variation in length of legs and bills enables multiple species to feed in the same habitat, particularly on the coast, without direct competition for food.

Common name	Binomial name	Status in the country	Global status	Trend	Frequency	Image
Eurasian curlew	Numenius arquata	N	Near threatened	▼	Winter visitor	
Whimby	Numenius phaeopus	N	Least concern	▼	Passage migrant	
Bar-tailed godwit	Limosa lapponica	N	Near threatened	▼	Winter visitor	
Black-tailed godwit	Limosa limosa	N	Near threatened	▼	Passage migrant	
Ruddy turnstone	Arenaria interpres	N	Least concern	▼	winter visitor	
Great knot	Calidris tenuirostris	R	Endangered	▼	vagrant	
Ruff	Calidris pugnax	N	Least concern	▼	Winter visitor	
Broad-billed sandpiper	Calidris falcinellus	N	Least concern	▼	Passage migrant	
Curlew sandpiper	Calidris ferruginea	N	Near threatened	▼	Passage migrant	
Temminck's stint	Calidris temminckii	N	Least concern	?	winter visitor, he is common on shores and rocky coasts	
Sanderling	Calidris alba	N	Least concern	?	winter visitor	
Dunlin	Calidris alpina	N	Least concern	▼	winter visitor	
Little stint	Calidris minuta	N	Least concern	▲	Winter visitor	
Jack snipe	Lymnocryptes minimus	N	Least concern	Steady	Scarce passage migrant	
Eurasian woodcock	Scolopax rusticola	A	Least concern	Steady	unverified vagrant records	
Common snipe	Gallinago gallinago	N	Least concern	▼	winter visitor	
Pin-tailed snipe	Gallinago stenura	A	Least concern	?	vagrant	
Terek sandpiper	Xenus cinereus	N	Least concern	▼	Resident	
Red-necked phalarope	Phalaropus lobatus	N	Least concern	▼	Scarce passage migrant	
Common sandpiper	Actitis hypoleucos	N	Least concern	▼	Very common throughout winter and late summer.	
Green sandpiper	Tringa ochropus	N	Least concern	▲	Relatively common throughout winter and spring	
Spotted redshank	Tringa erythropus	N	Least concern	Steady	Common winter visitor	
Common greenshank	Tringa nebularia	N	Least concern	Steady	Common winter visitor	
Marsh sandpiper	Tringa stagnatilis	N	Least concern	▼	Somewhat common winter visitor	
Wood sandpiper	Tringa glareola	N	Least concern	Steady	Common winter visitor	
Common redshank	Tringa totanus	N	Least concern	?	Winter visitor	

== Crab plover ==
Order: Charadriiformes Family: Dromadidae

The crab plover is related to the waders. It resembles a plover but with very long grey legs and a strong heavy black bill similar to a tern. It has black-and-white plumage, a long neck, partially webbed feet and a bill designed for eating crabs.

Common name	Binomial name	Status in the country	Global Status	Trend	Notes	Image
Crab-plover	Dromas ardeola	N	Least concern	Steady	passage migrant and winter visitor	

== Pratincoles and coursers ==
Order: Charadriiformes Family: Glareolidae

Glareolidae is a family of wading birds comprising the pratincoles, which have short legs, long pointed wings and long forked tails, and the coursers, which have long legs, short wings and long, pointed bills which curve downwards.

Common name	Binomial name	Status in the country	Global status	Trend	Notes	Image
Cream-coloured courser	Cursorius cursor	N	Least concern	▼	Scarce resident and common migrant	
Collared pratincole	Glareola pratincola	N	Least concern	▼	Passage migrant	
Black-winged pratincole	Glareola nordmanni	R	Near threatened	▼	Vagrant	
Small pratincole	Glareola lactea	A	Least concern	?	Vagrant.	

== Skuas and jaegers ==
Order: Charadriiformes Family: Stercorariidae

The family Stercorariidae are, in general, medium to large birds, typically with grey or brown plumage, often with white markings on the wings. They nest on the ground in temperate and arctic regions and are long-distance migrants.

Common name	Binomial name	Status in the country	Global status	Trend	Notes	Image
Pomarine skua	Stercorarius pomarinus	R	Least concern	Steady	rare winter visitor	
Arctic skua	Stercorarius parasiticus	N	Least concern	Steady	Rare winter visitor	
Long-tailed jaeger	Stercorarius longicaudus	A	Least concern	Steady	Vagrant	

== Gulls, terns, and skimmers ==
Order: Charadriiformes Family: Laridae

Laridae is a family of medium to large seabirds, the gulls, terns and kittiwakes. Gulls are typically grey or white, often with black markings on the head or wings. They have stout, longish bills and webbed feet. Terns are a group of generally medium to large seabirds typically with grey or white plumage, often with black markings on the head. Most terns hunt fish by diving but some pick insects off the surface of fresh water. Terns are generally long-lived birds, with several species known to live in excess of 30 years.

Common name	Binomial name	Status in the country	Global status	Trend	Notes	Image
Slender-billed gull	Chroicocephalus genei	N	Least concern	?	Abundant winter visitor	
Black-headed gull	Chroicocephalus ridibundus	N	Least concern	?	Common winter visitor	
Little gull	Hydrocoloeus minutus	N	Least concern	▲	Vagrant	
Sooty gull	Ichthyaetus hemprichii	N	Least concern	▼	Scarce winter visitor	
Pallas's gull	Ichthyaetus ichthyaetus	N	Least concern	▲	Winter visitor. Being the largest member of its order in the entire country, it is truly the beast of nations.	
Caspian gull	Larus cachinnans	N	Least concern	▲	Very common winter visitor. Several cryptic species and can be nightmarishly difficult do distinguish from other gulls such as L. fuscus and L. armenicus. Range overlapping with other similar gulls makes identification practically impossible	
Armenian gull	Larus armenicus	R	Least concern	▲	Vagrant	
Lesser black-backed gull	Larus fuscus	N	Least concern	▲	Winter visitor	
Bridled tern	Onychoprion anaethetus	N	Least concern	?	Breeder and passage migrant	
Little tern	Sternula albifrons	N	Least concern	▼	Passage migrant	
Saunders's tern	Sternula saundersi	N	Least concern	▼	Migrant breeder; this small tern is a frequenter of the coasts, especially in the East	
Gull-billed tern	Gelocheilodon nilotica	N	Least concern	▼	Winter visitor. It is noted for resembling a seagull, as well as having a short black beak. It frequents the northwest	
Caspian tern	Hydroprogne caspia	N	Least concern	▲	Uncommon resident. This cosmopolitan bird possesses a black cap and very bright orange beak, a feature that can be recognised from a distance	
White-winged tern	Chlidonias leucopterus	N	Least concern	▲	Paddage migrant; this bird is most common in the northern regions. It has distinct plumage, with a repressed grey in autumn and a jet-black body in spring, with the wings clearly divided with their bright white colour	
Whiskered tern	Chlidonias hybrida	N	Least concern	Steady	Common	
Common tern	Sterna hirundo	N	Least concern	?	Uncommon passage migrant	
White-cheeked tern	Sterna repressa	N	Least concern	▼	Common	
Great crested tern	Thalasseus bergii	N	Least concern	Steady	Passage migrant	
Sandwich tern	Thalasseus sandvicensis	N	Least concern	Steady	Winter visitor	
Lesser crested-tern	Thalasseus bengalensis	N	Least concern	Steady	Common	

== Tropicbirds ==
Order: Phaethontiformes Family: Phaethontidae

Tropicbirds are slender white birds of tropical oceans, with exceptionally long central tail feathers. Their heads and long wings have black markings.

Common name	Binomial name	Status in the country	Global status	Trend	Notes	Image
Red-billed tropicbird	Phaethon aethereus	R	Least concern	▼	Only breeds on Halul Island, absent from the mainland	

== Storks ==
Order: Ciconiiformes Family: Ciconiidae

Storks are large, long-legged, long-necked, wading birds with long, stout bills. Storks are mute, but bill-clattering is an important mode of communication at the nest. Their nests can be large and may be reused for many years. Many species are migratory.

Common name	Binomial name	Status in the country	Global status	Trend	Notes	Image
Black stork	Ciconia nigra	A	Least concern	?	Vagrant.	
White stork	Ciconia ciconia	N	Least concern	▲	Winter visitor	
Yellow-billed stork	Mycteria ibis	A	Least concern	▼	Vagrant, 1999	

== Cormorants and shags ==
Order: Suliformes Family: Phalacrocoracidae

Phalacrocoracidae is a family of medium to large coastal, fish-eating seabirds that includes cormorants and shags. Plumage colouration varies, with the majority having mainly dark plumage, some species being black-and-white and a few being colourful.

Common name	Binomial name	Status in the country	Global status	Trend	Notes	Image
Great cormorant	Phalacrocorax carbo	N	Least concern	▲	Common throughout winter	
Socotra cormorant	Phalacrocorax nigrogularis	E	Vulnerable	▼	Endemic to the gulf and offshore Yemen. Breeds on islands like Hawar and Socotra; globally threatened	

== Pelicans ==
Order: Pelecaniformes Family: Pelecanidae

Pelicans are large water birds with a distinctive pouch under their beak. As with other members of the order Pelecaniformes, they have webbed feet with four toes.

Common name	Binomial name	Status in the country	Global status	Trend	Notes	Image
Great white pelican	Pelecanus onocrotalus	A	Least concern	?	Vagrant	

== Herons, egrets, and bitterns ==
Order: Pelecaniformes Family: Ardeidae

The family Ardeidae contains the bitterns, herons and egrets. Herons and egrets are medium to large wading birds with long necks and legs. Bitterns tend to be shorter necked and more wary. Members of Ardeidae fly with their necks retracted, unlike other long-necked birds such as storks, ibises and spoonbills.

Common name	Binomial name	Status in the country	Global status	Trend	Notes	Image
Great bittern	Botaurus stellaris	R	Least concern	▼	rare winter visitor	
Little bittern	Ixobrychus minutus	N	Least concern	▼	passage migrant	
Grey heron	Ardea cinerea	N	Least concern	?	Where there is water, and where there is fish, there will be a grey heron. Indeed, it is the most common bird in the country, being found year-round in any aquatic habitat there is. Grey and tall, it is the largest heron in the country. It is easy to see this bird as it stands in the water, looking downwards for a fish or frog to pass by.	
Purple heron	Ardea purpurea	N	Least concern	▼	Resident and migrant	
Great egret	Egretta alba	N	Least concern	?	Overwintering	
Intermediate egret	Egretta intermedia	A	Least concern	▼	Vagrant	
Little egret	Egretta garzetta	N	Least concern	▲	winter visitor	
Western reef-heron	Egretta gularis	N	Least concern	Steady	Uncommon resident, abundant winter visitor	
Cattle egret	Bubulcus ibis	N	Least concern	▲	Passage migrant and winter visitor	
Squacco heron	Ardeola ralloides	N	Least concern	?	passage migrant, this bird also leaves behind a small non-breeding population in summer	
Indian pond-heron	Ardeola grayii	A	Least concern	?	Vagrant.	
Little heron	Butroides atricapilla	R	Least concern	▼	This bird is an uncommon resident	
Black-crowned night heron	Nycticorax nycticorax	N	Least concern	▼	Winter visitor	

== Ibises and spoonbills ==
Order: Pelecaniformes Family: Threskiornithidae

Threskiornithidae is a family of large terrestrial and wading birds which includes the ibises and spoonbills. They have long, broad wings with 11 primary and about 20 secondary feathers. They are strong fliers and despite their size and weight, very capable soarers.

Common name	Binomial name	Status in the country	Global status	Trend	Notes	Image
Glossy ibis	Plegadis falcinellus	N	Least concern	▼	A common bird in winter and spring, this bird frequents the grey water at several familiar locations. It is a unique bird, covered in black feathers that reflect blue, green, and purple when approached close. The bill of this bird is curved downwards.	
African sacred ibis	Threskiornis aethiopicus	A	Least concern	Steady	Vagrant	
Eurasian spoonbill	Platalea leucorodia	R	Least concern	?	rare migrant	

== Osprey ==
Order: Accipitriformes Family: Pandionidae

The family Pandionidae contains only one species, the osprey. The osprey is a medium-large raptor which is a specialist fish-eater with a worldwide distribution.

Common name	Binomial name	Status in the country	Global status	Trend	Frequency	Image
Osprey	Pandion haliaetus	N	Least concern	▲	Resident	

== Hawks, eagles, and kites ==
Order: Accipitriformes Family: Accipitridae

Accipitridae is a family of birds of prey, which includes hawks, eagles, kites, harriers and Old World vultures. These birds have powerful hooked beaks for tearing flesh from their prey, strong legs, powerful talons and keen eyesight.

Common name	Binomial name	Status in the country	Global status	Trend	Notes	Image
Black-winged kite	Elanus caeruleus	R	Least concern	Steady	Rare	
Eurasian griffon vulture	Gyps fulvus	A	Least concern	▲	Vagrant	
Egyptian vulture	Neophron percnopterus	R	Endangered	▼	Vagrant	
European honey-buzzard	Pernis apivorus	R	Least concern	Steady	Rare passage migrant	
Oriental honey-buzzard	Pernis ptilorhynchus	N	Least concern	▼	Scarce winter visitor	
Short-toed snake eagle	Circaetus gallicus	N	Least concern	Steady	Scarce passage migrant and winter visitor	
Booted eagle	Hieraaetus pennatus	A	Least concern	Steady	Vagrant	
Steppe eagle	Aquila nipalensis	R	Endangered	▼	Winter visitor. Differs from other eagles as it has thick "trousers" and is recognisable from a distance due to its mighty wingspan, which can exceed the height of a man	
Eastern imperial eagle	Aquila heliaca	R	Vulnerable	▼	Rare passage migrant. A migrating individual in Qatar was killed by poachers in late 2022	
Bonelli's eagle	Aquila fasciata	A	Least concern	▼	Vagrant	
Greater spotted-eagle	Clanga clanga	N	Vulnerable	▼	Scarce localised winter visitor; heavily persecuted in the country	
White-tailed sea eagle	Haliaeetus albicilla	A	Least concern	▲	Vagrant recorded once in March 2022	
Western marsh-harrier	Circus aeruginosus	N	Least concern	Steady	Winter visitor	
Pallid harrier	Circus macrourus	N	Near threatened	▼	Winter visitor	
Montagu's harrier	Circus pygargus	N	Least concern	▼	Scarce passage migrant and winter visitor	
Shikra	Accipiter badius	A	Least concern	Steady	Vagrant	
Levant sparrowhawk	Accipiter brevipes	A	Least concern	Steady	Vagrant	
Eurasian sparrowhawk	Accipiter nisus	R	Least concern	Steady	Scarce winter visitor	
Northern goshawk	Accipiter gentilis	A	Least concern	?	Vagrant	
Black kite	Milvus migrans	N	Least concern	Steady	Scarce winter visitor. Uniform brown colour, may be mistaken for harriers however its soars with the wings outstretched as opposed to being held in a "v" shape	
Common buzzard	Buteo buteo	A	Least concern	▲	Vagrant	
Long-legged buzzard	Buteo rufinus	A	Least concern	Steady	frequent winter visitor	

== Barn-owls ==
Order: Strigiformes Family: Tytonidae

Barn-owls are medium to large owls with large heads and characteristic heart-shaped faces. They have long strong legs with powerful talons.

Common name	Binomial name	Status in the country	Global status	Trend	Notes	Image
Western barn owl	Tyto alba	N	Least concern	Steady	This bird is a scarce resident in the country	

== Owls ==
Order: Strigiformes Family: Strigidae

The typical owls are small to large solitary nocturnal birds of prey. They have large forward-facing eyes and ears, a hawk-like beak and a conspicuous circle of feathers around each eye called a facial disk.

Common name	Binomial name	Status in the country	Global status	Trend	Notes	Image
Eurasian scops-owl	Otus scops	N	Least concern	▼	Uncommon passage migrant. Recognised by its large ear tufts, it is rarely seen at day. The plumage mayvary	
Pallid scops-owl	Otus brucei	A	Least concern	Steady	Vagrant	
Pharaoh eagle owl	Bubo ascalaphus	N	Least concern	Steady	An uncommon resident, this is the nation's largest. It may be found in the south, roosting in thick bushes or on arid ground	
Lilith owlet	Athene noctua	N	Least concern	Steady	Resident.	
Long-eared owl	Asio otus	A	Least concern	▼	Vagrant.	
Short-eared owl	Asio flammeus	R	Least concern	▼	rare winter visitor	

== Hoopoes ==
Order: Bucerotiformes Family: Upupidae

Hoopoes have black, white and orangey-pink colouring with a large erectile crest on their head.

Common name	Binomial name	Status in the country	Global status	Trend	Notes	Image
Eurasian hoopoe	Upupa epops	N	Least concern	▼	Some migration in winter, most abundant in spring, especially April. This bird is unique and unmatched in appearance, and has an almost "legendary" status in the Middle East, often being seen as a symbol of birds in the region	

== Kingfishers ==
Order: Coraciiformes Family: Alcedinidae

Kingfishers are medium-sized birds with large heads, long, pointed bills, short legs and stubby tails.

Common name	Binomial name	Status in the country	Global status	Trend	Notes	Image
Common kingfisher	Alcedo atthis	N	Least concern	?	Uncommon migrant	
White-throated kingfisher	Halcyon smyrnensis	A	Least concern	▲	Vagrant	
Grey-headed kingfisher	Halcyon leucocephala	A	Least concern	Steady	Vagrant 2025	
Pied kingfisher	Ceryle rudis	N	Least concern	?	uncommon winter visitor	

== Bee-eaters ==
Order: Coraciiformes Family: Meropidae

The bee-eaters are a group of near passerine birds in the family Meropidae. Most species are found in Africa but others occur in southern Europe, Madagascar, Australia and New Guinea. They are characterised by richly coloured plumage, slender bodies and usually elongated central tail feathers. All are colourful and have long downturned bills and pointed wings, which give them a swallow-like appearance when seen from afar.

Common name	Binomial name	Status in the country	Global status	Trend	Notes	Image
Arabian green bee-eater	Merops cyanophrys	A	Least concern	▲	Vagrant	
Blue-cheeked bee-eater	Merops persicus	N	Least concern	Steady	Much like its European friend, it is observed mostly in spring and to a lesser extent autumn.	
European bee-eater	Merops apiaster	N	Least concern	Steady	The most common and beautiful bee-eater, it is observed in Qatar during spring and to a lesser extent autumn	

== Rollers ==
Order: Coraciiformes Family: Coraciidae

Rollers resemble crows in size and build, but are more closely related to the kingfishers and bee-eaters. They share the colourful appearance of those groups with blues and browns predominating. The two inner front toes are connected, but the outer toe is not.

Common name	Binomial name	Status in the country	Global status	Trend	Notes	Image
European roller	Coracias garrulus	N	Least concern	▼	Passage migrant	
Indian roller	Coracias benghalensis	A	Least concern	▲	Vagrant	

== Woodpeckers ==
Order: Piciformes Family: Picidae

Woodpeckers are small to medium-sized birds with chisel-like beaks, short legs, stiff tails and long tongues used for capturing insects. Some species have feet with two toes pointing forward and two backward, while several species have only three toes. Many woodpeckers have the habit of tapping noisily on tree trunks with their beaks.

Common name	Binomial name	Status in the country	Global status	Trend	Notes	Image
Eurasian wryneck	Jynx torquilla	N	Least concern	Steady	Vagrant	

== Falcons and caracaras ==
Order: Falconiformes Family: Falconidae

Falconidae is a family of diurnal birds of prey. They differ from hawks, eagles and kites in that they kill with their beaks instead of their talons.

Common name	Binomial name	Status in the country	Global status	Trend	Notes	Image
Lesser kestrel	Falco naumanni	N	Least concern	Steady	Found in autumn and more plentifully in spring, the lesser kestrel is a fascinating bird. The females are reddish brown with dark blotches decorating its upper side. Males have slate-blue heads and wingtips, with a rusty mantle and pale, spotted underside	
Eurasian kestrel	Falco tinnuculus	N	Least concern	▼	Common winter visitor	
Amur falcon	Falco amurensis	A	Least concern	Steady	Vagrant	
Sooty falcon	Falco concolor	R	Vulnerable	▼	rare summer visitor	
Merlin	Falco columbarius	R	Least concern	▼	rare winter visitor	
Eurasian hobby	Falco subbuteo	N	Least concern	▼	Winter visitor	
Peregrine falcon	Falco peregrinus	R	Least concern	▲	Vagrant	

== Old World parrots ==
Order: Psittaciformes Family: Psittaculidae

Characteristic features of parrots include a strong curved bill, an upright stance, strong legs, and clawed zygodactyl feet. Many parrots are vividly colored, and some are multi-colored. In size they range from 8 cm (3.1 in) to 1 m (3.3 ft) in length. Old World parrots are found from Africa east across south and southeast Asia and Oceania to Australia and New Zealand.

Common name	Binomial name	Status in the country	Global status	Trend	Notes	Image
Alexandrine parakeet	Psittacula eupatoria	I	Near threatened	▼	An introduced species, this bird can be found on the eastern side of the country. It is the largest member of its family, and its pink-black "collar" is a key feature of males. Can be distinguished from the rose-ring by its larger size and red "epaulette" mark	
Rose-ringed parakeet	Psittacula krameri	I	Least concern	▲	This introduced species is found in most urban environments, the capital Doha and Dukhan. Only males possess the characteristic "rose ring". Sightings of this bird are often preceded by a very loud screaming – in flight they are recognised by their cries and tail, which may be as long as the bird itself.	

== Old World orioles ==
Order: Passeriformes Family: Oriolidae

The Old World orioles are colourful passerine birds. They are not related to the New World orioles.

Common name	Binomial name	Status in the country	Global status	Trend	Notes	Image
Eurasian golden oriole	Oriolus oriolus	N	Least concern	Steady	Late spring visitor	

== Shrikes ==
Order: Passeriformes Family: Laniidae

Shrikes are passerine birds known for their habit of catching other birds and small animals and impaling the uneaten portions of their bodies on thorns. A typical shrike's beak is hooked, like a bird of prey.

Common name	Binomial name	Status in the country	Global status	Trend	Notes	Image
Red-backed shrike	Lanius collurio	N	Least concern	▼	Uncommon passage migrant and winter visitor. Recognised for its rusty upper wings. Females lack the "mask"	
Red-tailed shrike	Lanius phoenicuroides	N	Least concern	Steady	Passage migrant and winter visitor. Very similar to the formerly conspecific isabelline shrike, albeit darker in colour	
Isabelline shrike	Lanius isabellinus	N	Least concern	Steady	Passage migrant and winter visitor, recognised for its soft ruddy shade	
Bay-backed shrike	Lanius vitattus	A	Least concern	Steady	Vagrant; possibly from the nearby UAE	
Long-tailed shrike	Lanius schach	A	Least concern	?	Vagrant	
Great gray shrike	Lanius excubitor • Lanius excubitor ssp. aucheri (Arabian grey shrike) • Lanius excubitor ssp. pallidirostris (Steppe grey shrike)	N	Least concern	▼	The largest and most powerful shrike, the great grey shrike has 2 common subspecies in Qatar. The Arabian grey shrike may be observed year-round, while the steppe grey shrike is less common, being a passage migrant from Asia. The nominate subspecies has been recorded as a vagrant in the country.	
Lesser gray shrike	Lanius minor	N	Least concern	▼	Uncommon passage migrant and autumn visitor. Has a larger "mask" than the similarly coloured great grey shrike.	Lanîûs mînor
Masked shrike	Lanius nubicus	N	Least concern	▼	Passage migrant and winter visitor	
Woodchat shrike	Lanius senator	N	Least concern	▼	Passage migrant and winter visitor	

== Crows, jays, and magpies ==
Order: Passeriformes Family: Corvidae

The family Corvidae includes crows, ravens, jays, choughs, magpies, treepies, nutcrackers and ground jays. Corvids are above average in size among the Passeriformes, and some of the larger species show high levels of intelligence.

Common name	Binomial name	Status in the country	Global status	Trend	Notes	Image
House crow	Corvus splendens	I	Least concern	Steady	Coloniser	
Brown-necked raven	Corvus rufficolis	A	Least concern	Steady	Vagrant	

== Penduline-tits ==
Order: Passeriformes Family: Remizidae

The penduline-tits are a group of small passerine birds related to the true tits. They are insectivores.

Common name	Binomial name	Status in the country	Global status	Trend	Notes	Image
Eurasian penduline-tit	Remiz pendulinus	A	Least concern	▲	Vagrant	

== Larks ==
Order: Passeriformes Family: Alaudidae

Larks are small terrestrial birds with often extravagant songs and display flights. Most larks are fairly dull in appearance. Their food is insects and seeds.

Common name	Binomial name	Status in the country	Global status	Trend	Notes	Image
Greater hoopoe-lark	Alaemon alaudipes	N	Least concern	▼	Resident	
Bar-tailed lark	Ammomanes cincturus	N	Least concern	▼	resident breeder	
Desert lark	Ammomanes deserti	N	Least concern	▲	Resident	
Black-crowned sparrow lark	Eremopterix nigriceps	N	Least concern	▲	Resident	
Horned lark	Eremophila alpestris	A	Least concern	▼	Vagrant.	
Greater short-toed lark	Calandrella brachydactyla	N	Least concern	?	Winter visitor	
Lesser short-toed lark	Alaudala rufescens	N	Least concern	▼	A defunct taxon, historically included in recent lists. It has been divided into two taxa, the Mediterranean and Turkestan larks. It is believed the latter inhabits Qatar.	
Bimaculated lark	Melanocorypha bimaculata	R	Least concern	Steady	rare winter visitor	
Calandra lark	Melanocorypha calandra	A	Least concern	▼	Vagrant	
Arabian lark	Eremalauda eremodites	A	Least concern	Steady	Vagrant	
Turkestan short-toed lark	Eremalauda eremodites	N	Not recognised by the IUCN	▼	Uncommon in the country, this species is more likely to be encountered in open deserts. A new derivative, this species was considered conspecific with the lesser short-toed lark until 2020.	
Woodlark	Lullula arborea	A	Least concern	▲	Vagrant	
Eurasian skylark	Alauda arvensis	R	Least concern	▼	scarce winter visitor	
Crested lark	Galerdia cristata	N	Least concern	▼	Breeding resident	

== Cisticolas and allies ==
Order: Passeriformes Family: Cisticolidae

The Cisticolidae are warblers found mainly in warmer southern regions of the Old World. They are generally very small birds of drab brown or grey appearance found in open country such as grassland or scrub.

Common name	Binomial name	Status in the country	Global status	Trend	Frequency	Image
Delicate prinia	Prinia lepida	A	Not recognised by the IUCN	?	Taxonomy disputed; it is considered part of the graceful prinia species complex by several authorities	

== Reed warblers and allies ==
Order: Passeriformes Family: Acrocephalidae

The members of this family are usually rather large for "warblers". Most are rather plain olivaceous brown above with much yellow to beige below. They are usually found in open woodland, reedbeds, or tall grass. The family occurs mostly in southern to western Eurasia and surroundings, but it also ranges far into the Pacific, with some species in Africa.

Common name	Binomial name	Status in the country	Global status	Trend	Notes	Image
Syke's warbler	Iduna rama	A	Least concern	Steady	Vagrant	
Eastern olivaceous warbler	Iduna pallida	N	Least concern	Steady	scarce passage migrant	
Upcher's warbler	Hippolais languida	N	Least concern	Steady	Winter visitor	
Icterine warbler	Hippolais icterina	N	Least concern	▼	Vagrant	
Moustached warbler	Acrocephalus melanopogon	A	Least concern	Steady	Vagrant.	Moustached Warbler Acrocephalus melanopogon by Dr. Raju Kasambe (2)
Sedge warbler	Acrocephalus schoenobaenus	N	Least concern	Steady	Rare passage migrant	
Paddyfield warbler	Acrocephalus agricola	A	Least concern	▼	Vagrant.	
Marsh warbler	Acrocephalus palustris	R	Least concern	Steady	common passage migrant	
Eurasian reed warbler	Acrocephalus scirpaceus	N	Least concern	Steady	Uncommon	
Basra reed warbler	Acrocephalus griseldis	R	Endangered	Steady	Vagrant recorded in the country in 2017.	
Great reed warbler	Acrocephalus arundinaceus	N	Least concern	▼	Uncommon winter visitor	
Clamorous reed warbler	Acrocephalus stentoreus	N	Least concern	Steady	Winter visitor	

== Grassbirds and allies ==
Order: Passeriformes Family: Locustellidae

Locustellidae are a family of small insectivorous songbirds found mainly in Eurasia, Africa, and the Australian region. They are smallish birds with tails that are usually long and pointed, and tend to be drab brownish or buffy all over.

Common name	Binomial name	Status in the country	Global Status	Trend	Notes	Image
Savi's warbler	Locustella luscinioides	A	Least concern	Steady	Vagrant.	
Common grasshopper-warbler	Locustella naevia	A	Least concern	Steady	Rare passage migrant.	

== Swallows ==
Order: Passeriformes Family: Hirundinidae

The family Hirundinidae is adapted to aerial feeding. They have a slender streamlined body, long pointed wings and a short bill with a wide gape. The feet are adapted to perching rather than walking, and the front toes are partially joined at the base.

Common name	Binomial name	Status in the country	Global status	Trend	Notes	Image
Bank swallow	R. riparia	N	Least concern	Steady	Common in both late summer and winter	
Eurasian crag-martin	Ptyonoprogne rupestris	R	Least concern	Steady	Rare winter visitor	
Pale crag-martin	Ptyonoprogne fuligula	R	Least concern	Steady	Rare winter visitor	
Barn swallow	Hirundo rustica	N	Least concern	▼	A frequent and abundant passage migrant	
Wire-tailed swallow	Hirundo smithii	A	Least concern	▲	Vagrant recorded in 2023	
Red-rumped swallow	Cecropis rufula	N	Least concern	Steady	Passage migrant	
Common house-martin	Delichon urbicum	N	Least concern	▼	uncommon	

== Bulbuls ==
Order: Passeriformes Family: Pycnonotidae

Bulbuls are medium-sized songbirds. Some are colourful with yellow, red or orange vents, cheeks, throats or supercilia, but most are drab, with uniform olive-brown to black plumage. Some species have distinct crests.

Common name	Binomial name	Status in the country	Global status	Trend	Notes	Image
Red-vented bulbul	Pycnonotus cafer	I	Least concern	▲	Resident in parks and specific urban areas.	
White-eared bulbul	Pycnonotus leucotis	I	Least concern	▼	Found nationwide	

== Leaf warblers ==
Order: Passeriformes Family: Phylloscopidae

Leaf warblers are a family of small insectivorous birds found mostly in Eurasia and ranging into Wallacea and Africa. The species are of various sizes, often green-plumaged above and yellow below, or more subdued with greyish-green to greyish-brown colours.

Common name	Binomial name	Status in the country	Global status	Trend	Notes	Image
Wood warbler	Phylloscopus sibilatrix	A	Least concern	▼	Vagrant	
Yellow-browed warbler	Phylloscopus inornatus	A	Least concern	Steady	Vagrant	
Hume's warbler	Phylloscopus humei	A	Least concern	Steady	Vagrant	
Plain leaf warbler	Phylloscopus neglectus	A	Least concern	Steady	Vagrant	
Williw warbler	Phylloscopus trochilus	N	Least concern	▼	Common in spring and autumn	
Common chiffchaff	Phylloscopus collybita	N	Least concern	▲	Alike the willow warbler, but more common in the winter.	

== Sylviid warblers, parrotbills, and allies ==
Order: Passeriformes Family: Sylviidae

The family Sylviidae is a group of small insectivorous passerine birds. They mainly occur as breeding species, as the common name implies, in Europe, Asia and, to a lesser extent, Africa. Most are of generally undistinguished appearance, but many have distinctive songs.

Common name	Binomial name	Status in the country	Global status	Trend	Notes	Image
Eurasian blackcap	Sylvia atricapilla	N	Least concern	▲	Passage migrant	
Garden warbler	Sylvia borin	A	Least concern	▼	rare passage migrant	
Asian desert warbler	Curruca nana	N	Least concern	Steady	A common winter visitor, this small round bird is recognised by its grey body, ruddy tail and yellow eyes. This bird has a special relationship with the desert wheatear, and follows it if alerted by a predator.	
Barred warbler	Curruca nisoria	N	Least concern	Steady	Uncommon passage migrant	
Lesser whitethroat	C. curruca	N	Least concern	Steady	Common during spring migration and winter	
Eastern Orphean warbler	Curruca crassirostris	N	Least concern	▲	rare passage migrant	
Menetries's warbler	Curruca mystacea	N	Least concern	Steady	passage migrant	
Greater whitethroat	Curruca communis	N	Least concern	▲	common migrant	

== Starlings ==
Order: Passeriformes Family: Sturnidae

Starlings are small to medium-sized passerine birds. Their flight is strong and direct and they are very gregarious. Their preferred habitat is fairly open country. They eat insects and fruit. Plumage is typically dark with a metallic sheen.

Common name	Binomial name	Status in the country	Global status	Trend	Notes	Image
European starling	Sturnus vulgaris	N	Least concern	▼	Migratory; winter visitor	
Rosy starling	Pastor roseus	A	Least concern	?	Vagrant	
Common myna	Acridotheres tristis	I	Least concern	▼	Resident breeder	

== Thrushes and allies ==
Order: Passeriformes Family: Turdidae

The thrushes are a group of passerine birds that occur mainly in the Old World. They are plump, soft plumaged, small to medium-sized insectivores or sometimes omnivores, often feeding on the ground. Many have attractive songs.

Common name	Binomial name	Status in the country	Global status	Trend	Notes	Image
Song thrush	Turdus philomelos	N	Least concern	▲	Overwintering	
Redwing	Turdus iliacus	A	Near threatened	▼	First record in late 2023	
Eurasian blackbird	Turdus merula	A	Least concern	▲	Vagrant	
Fieldfare	Turdus pilaris	A	Least concern	▼	Vagrant.	
Ring ouzel	Turdus torquatus	A	Least concern	Steady	Vagrant	
Black-throated thrush	Turdus atrogularis	A	Least concern	?	Vagrant	
Red-throated thrush	Turdus ruficollis	A	Least concern	?	Vagrant	
Dusky thrush	Turdus eunomus	A	Least concern	?	Vagrant	
White's thrush	Zoothera aurea	A	Least concern	▼	Vagrant recorded in 2022	

== Old World flycatchers ==
Order: Passeriformes Family: Muscicapidae

Old World flycatchers are a large group of small passerine birds native to the Old World. They are mainly small arboreal insectivores. The appearance of these birds is highly varied, but they mostly have weak songs and harsh calls.

Common name	Binomial name	Status in the country	Global Status	Trend	Notes	Image
Black scrub-robin	Cercotrichas podobe	R	Least concern	Steady	Rare winter visitor	
Spotted flycatcher	Muscicapa striata	N	Least concern	▼	Common passage migrant in spring and winter.	
Rufous-tailed scrub-robin	Cercotrichas galactotes	N	Least concern	Steady	Overwintering	
European robin	Erithacus rubecula	A	Least concern	▲	Vagrant	
White-throated robin	Irania gutturalis	N	Least concern	Steady	Spring visitor	
Thrush nightingale	Luscinia luscinia	R	Least concern	Steady	Rare passage migrant	
Common nightingale	Luscinia megarhynchos	N	Least concern	Steady	Winter visitor	
Bluethroat	Luscinia svecica	N	Least concern	Steady	Common in winter	
Red-breasted flycatcher	Ficedula parva	N	Least concern	▲	This uncommon bird is mostly seen in autumn	
Semi-collared flycatcher	Ficedula semitorquata	R	Least concern	▼	Rare passage migrant	
Rufous-backed redstart	Phoenicurus erythronotus	R	Least concern	Steady	rare passage migrant	
Common redstart	Phoenicurus phoenicurus	N	Least concern	▲	Spring visitor	
Black redstart	Phoenicurus ochruros	N	Least concern	▲	passage migrant	
Blue rock thrush	Monticola solitarus	N	Least concern	Steady	Common passage migrant and uncommon winter visitor	
Common rock thrush	Monticola saxtalis	N	Least concern	▼	Common passage migrant	
Whinchat	Saxicola ruberta	N	Least concern	▼	occasional passage migrant.	
European stonechat	Saxicola rubicola	N	Recognised as a subspecies of the common stonechat by the IUCN. Thus, no status exists for this species	Steady	This bird visits in winter and is a passage migrant. Sexual dimorphism is present as the male has a bright red breast. The bird's habit of perching high on posts make it easily spotted	
Siberian stonechat	Saxicola maurus	N	Recognised as a subspecies of the common stonechat by the IUCN. Thus, no status exists for this species	Steady	The Siberian stonechat is practically identical to the European stonechat, and is in fact still considered conspecific by several taxonomic authorities. The only noticeable differences to an observer is its white colouration which is more prevalent as well as the colour of its underparts being reduced	
Pied bushchat	Saxicola caprata	A	Least concern	Steady	Vagrant	
Northern wheatear	Oenanthe oenanthe	N	Least concern	▼	Common passage migrant	
Isabelline wheatear	Oenanthe isabellina	N	Least concern	Steady	Very Common throughout winter and spring	
Hooded wheatear	Oenanthe monacha	R	Least concern	Steady	Rare winter visitor	
Desert wheatear	Oenanthe deserti	N	Least concern	Steady	winter visitor	
Pied wheatear	Oenanthe pleschanka	N	Least concern	Steady	Common winter visitor	
Pied wheatear	Oenanthe pleschanka	N	Least concern	Steady	Common visitor	
Variable wheatear	Oenanthe picata	A	Least concern	Steady	Vagrant	
Hume's wheatear	Oenanthe albonigra	A	Least concern	Steady	Vagrant	
White-crowned wheatear	Oenanthe albonigra	A	Least concern	Steady	Vagrant	
Finsch's wheatear	Oenanthe finschii	R	Least concern	Steady	Rare winter visitor.	
Mourning wheatear	Oenanthe lugens	N	Least concern	Steady	Winter visitor	
Kurdish wheatear	Oenanthe xanthoprymna	A	Least concern	Steady	Vagrant.	
Persian wheatear	Oenanthe chrysopygia	N	Least concern	Steady	common winter visitor	

== Hypocolius ==
Order: Passeriformes Family: Hypocoliidae

The hypocolius is a small Middle Eastern bird with the shape and soft plumage of a waxwing. They are mainly a uniform grey colour except the males have a black triangular mask around their eyes.

Common name	Binomial name	Status in the country	Global status	Trend	Notes	Image
Hypocolius	Hypocolius ampelinus	N	Least concern	?	Uncommon Winter visitor	

== Sunbirds and spiderhunters ==
Order: Passeriformes Family: Nectariniidae

The sunbirds and spiderhunters are very small passerine birds which feed largely on nectar, although they will also take insects, especially when feeding young. Flight is fast and direct on their short wings. Most species can take nectar by hovering like a hummingbird, but usually perch to feed.

Common name	Binomial name	Status in the country	Global status	Trend	Notes	Image
Purple sunbird	Cinnyris asiaticus	A	Least concern	Steady	Vagrant recorded in 2020	

== Weavers and allies ==
Order: Passeriformes Family: Ploceidae

The weavers are small passerine birds related to the finches. They are seed-eating birds with rounded conical bills. The males of many species are brightly coloured, usually in red or yellow and black, some species show variation in colour only in the breeding season.

Common name	Binomial name	Status in the country	Global status	Trend	Notes	Image
Streaked weaver	Ploceus manyar	I	Least concern	Steady	Introduced	
Black-breasted weaver	Ploceus benghalensis	I	Least concern	Steady	Introduced	

== Waxbills and allies ==
Order: Passeriformes Family: Estrildidae

The estrildid finches are small passerine birds of the Old World tropics and Australasia. They are gregarious and often colonial seed eaters with short thick but pointed bills. They are all similar in structure and habits, but have wide variation in plumage colours and patterns.

Common name	Binomial name	Status in the country	Global status	Trend	Notes	Image
Red avadavat	Amandava amandava	A	Least concern	?	Vagrant	
Indian silverbill	Eudoice malabarica	I	Least concern	Steady	Introduced	

== Old World sparrows ==
Order: Passeriformes Family: Passeridae

Old World sparrows are small passerine birds. In general, sparrows tend to be small, plump, brown or grey birds with short tails and short powerful beaks. Sparrows are seed eaters, but they also consume small insects.

Common name	Binomial name	Status in the country	Global status	Trend	Notes	Image
House sparrow	Passer domesticus	N	Least concern	▼	Common	
Spanish sparrow	Passer hispaniolensis	N	Least concern	▼	Resident breeder	
Yellow-throated sparrow	Gymnoris xanthocollis	A	Least concern	▼	Vagrant	
Pale rockfinch	Carpispiza brachydactyla	N	Least concern	Steady	Passage migrant	

== Wagtails and pipits ==
Order: Passeriformes Family: Motacillidae

Motacillidae is a family of small passerine birds with medium to long tails. They include the wagtails, longclaws and pipits. They are slender, ground feeding insectivores of open country.

Common name	Binomial name	Status in the country	Global status	Trend	Notes	Image
Gray wagtail	Motacilla cinerea	N	Least concern	Steady	Winter visitor	
Yellow wagtail	Motacilla flava	N	Least concern	▼	Common passage migrant	
Citrine wagtail	Motacilla citreola	A	Least concern	▲	Uncommon	
White wagtail	Motacilla alba	N	Least concern	Steady	Very common migrant	
Richard's pipit	Anthus richardi	A	Least concern	Steady	Vagrant	
Long-billed pipit	Anthus similis	A	Least concern	Steady	Vagrant	
Tawny pipit	Anthus campestris	N	Least concern	Steady	Common winter visitor	
Meadow pipit	Anthus pratensis	N	Near threatened	▼	Uncommon winter visitor	
Tree pipit	Anthus trivialis	N	Least concern	▼	Scarce	
Red-throated pipit	Anthus cervinus	N	Least concern	Steady	Winter visitor	
Water pipit	Anthus spinoletta	N	Least concern	Steady	Common in winter, this large pipit is easy to identify as it has black legs. It frequents wetlands, as suggested by its name.	
American pipit	Anthus rubescens	A	Least concern	▼	Vagrant.	

== Finches, euphonias, and allies ==
Order: Passeriformes Family: Fringillidae

Finches are seed-eating passerine birds, that are small to moderately large and have a strong beak, usually conical and in some species very large. All have twelve tail feathers and nine primaries. These birds have a bouncing flight with alternating bouts of flapping and gliding on closed wings, and most sing well.

Common name	Binomial name	Status in the country	Global status	Trend	Notes	Image
Common chaffinch	Fringilla coelebs	A	Least concern	▲	Vagrant	
Brambling	Fringilla montifringilla	A	Least concern	▼	Vagrant	
Hawfinch	C. coccothraustes	A	Least concern	▲	Vagrant.	
Common rosefinch	Carpodacus erythrinus	R	Least concern	▼	rare passage migrant	
Trumpeter finch	Bucanetes githagineus	A	Least concern	Steady	Vagrant	
Desert finch	Rhodospiza obsoleta	A	Least concern	Steady	Vagrant	
Eurasian linnet	Linaria cannabina	A	Least concern	Steady	Vagrant	
Eurasian siskin	S. spinus	A	Least concern	▼	Vagrant	

== Old World buntings ==
Order: Passeriformes Family: Emberizidae

The emberizids are a large family of passerine birds. They are seed-eating birds with distinctively shaped bills. Many emberizid species have distinctive head patterns.

Common name	Binomial name	Status in the country	Global status	Trend	Notes	Image
Black-headed bunting	Emberiza melanocephala	R	Least concern	?	rare passage migrant	
Corn bunting	Emberiza calandra	N	Least concern	▼	Winter visitor and uncommon breeder	
Cinereous bunting	Emberiza cineracea	R	Near threatened	▼	Rare passage migrant	
Ortolan bunting	Emberiza hortulana	N	Least concern	▼	Pulling up to the table at early winter and early spring, this cheerful bird can be found among other birds in meadows. Its brown patterns may make it look indistinct but the yellow markings on this bird's face will confirm its identification	
Cretzschmar's bunting	Emberiza caesia	R	Least concern	Steady	Vagrant	
Rustic bunting	Emberiza rustica	A	Vulnerable	▼	Vagrant	

== See also ==
- List of mammals of Qatar
- List of Lepidoptera of Qatar
- List of birds
- Lists of birds by region
