= List of mammals of Qatar =

This is a list of the mammal species recorded in Qatar. There are thirty-five mammal species in Qatar, one of which is vulnerable, and one is near threatened.

The following tags are used to highlight each species' conservation status as assessed by the International Union for Conservation of Nature:

| EX | Extinct | No reasonable doubt that the last individual has died. |
| EW | Extinct in the wild | Known only to survive in captivity or as a naturalized populations well outside its previous range. |
| CR | Critically endangered | The species is in imminent risk of extinction in the wild. |
| EN | Endangered | The species is facing an extremely high risk of extinction in the wild. |
| VU | Vulnerable | The species is facing a high risk of extinction in the wild. |
| NT | Near threatened | The species does not meet any of the criteria that would categorise it as risking extinction but it is likely to do so in the future. |
| LC | Least concern | There are no current identifiable risks to the species. |
| DD | Data deficient | There is inadequate information to make an assessment of the risks to this species. |

Some species were assessed using an earlier set of criteria. Species assessed using this system have the following instead of near threatened and least concern categories:

| LR/cd | Lower risk/conservation dependent | Species which were the focus of conservation programmes and may have moved into a higher risk category if that programme was discontinued. |
| LR/nt | Lower risk/near threatened | Species which are close to being classified as vulnerable but are not the subject of conservation programmes. |
| LR/lc | Lower risk/least concern | Species for which there are no identifiable risks. |

== Order: Sirenia (manatees and dugongs) ==
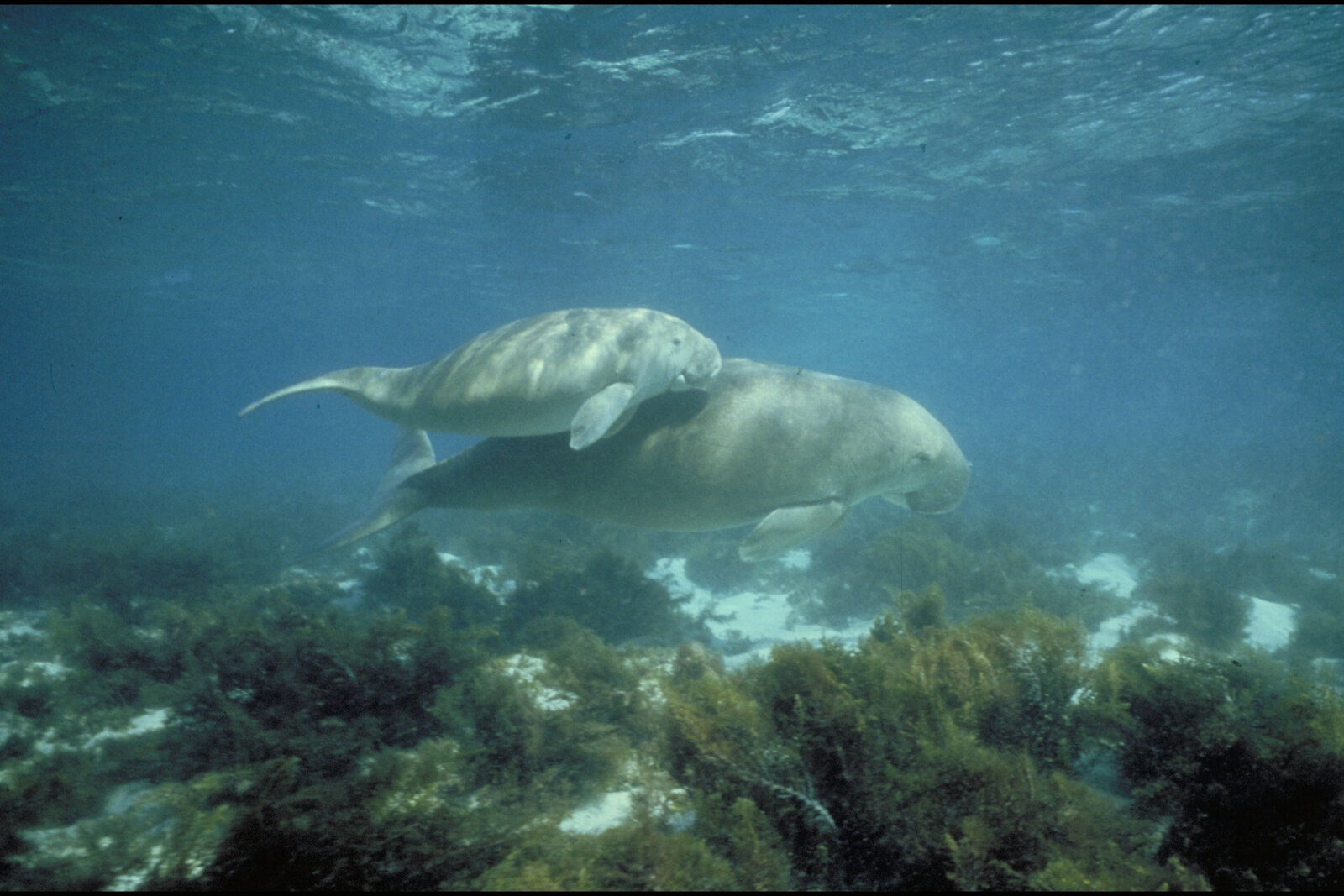
Dugongs

Sirenia is an order of fully aquatic, herbivorous mammals that inhabit rivers, estuaries, coastal marine waters, swamps, and marine wetlands. All four species are endangered.

- Family: Dugongidae
  - Genus: Dugong
    - Dugong, D. dugon VU

== Order: Rodentia (rodents) ==
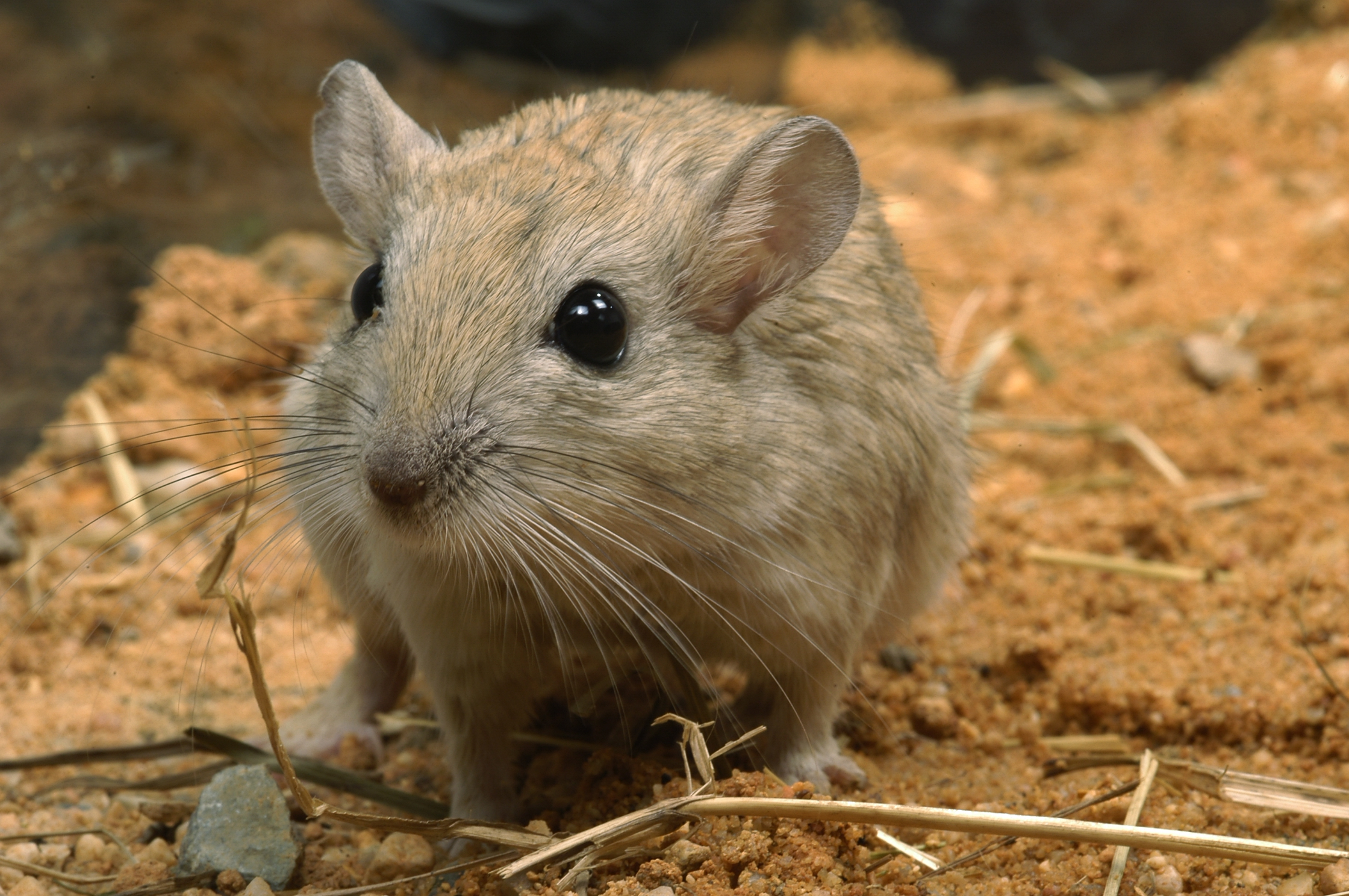
Sundevall's jird

Rodents make up the largest order of mammals, with over 40% of mammalian species. They have two incisors in the upper and lower jaw which grow continually and must be kept short by gnawing. Most rodents are small though the capybara can weigh up to 45 kg (99 lb).

- Suborder: Myomorpha
  - Family: Dipodidae (jerboas)
    - Genus: Jaculus
      - Lesser Egyptian jerboa, J. jaculus LC
  - Family: Muridae (mice, rats, gerbils)
    - Subfamily: Gerbillinae
      - Genus: Gerbillus
        - Cheesman's gerbil, G. cheesmani LC
        - Wagner's gerbil, G. dasyurus LC
        - Dwarf gerbil, G. nanus LC
      - Genus: Meriones
        - Libyan jird, M. libycus LC
        - Sundevall's jird, M. crassus LC
    - Subfamily: Murinae
      - Genus: Mus
        - House mouse, M. musculus LC introduced
      - Genus: Rattus
        - Black rat, R. rattus LC introduced
        - Brown rat, R. norvegicus LC introduced

== Order: Lagomorpha (lagomorphs) ==
The lagomorphs comprise two families, Leporidae (hares and rabbits), and Ochotonidae (pikas). Though they can resemble rodents, and were classified as a superfamily in that order until the early twentieth century, they have since been considered a separate order. They differ from rodents in a number of physical characteristics, such as having four incisors in the upper jaw rather than two.

- Family: Leporidae
  - Genus: Lepus
    - Cape hare, Lepus capensis LC

== Order: Eulipotyphla (shrews and hedgehogs) ==
Eulipotyphla comprises the hedgehogs and gymnures (family Erinaceidae, formerly also the order Erinaceomorpha) and true shrews (family Soricidae).

- Family: Erinaceidae (hedgehogs)
  - Subfamily: Erinaceinae
    - Genus: Paraechinus
      - Desert hedgehog, Paraechinus aethiopicus LC

== Order: Chiroptera (bats) ==
The bats' most distinguishing feature is that their forelimbs are developed as wings, making them the only mammals capable of flight. Bat species account for about 20% of all mammals.

- Family: Vespertilionidae
  - Subfamily: Myotinae
    - Genus: Otonycteris
      - Desert long-eared bat, Otonycteris hemprichii LC
  - Subfamily: Vespertilioninae
    - Genus: Rhyneptesicus
      - Sind bat, Rhyneptesicus nasutus LC
- Family: Emballonuridae
  - Subfamily: Hipposiderinae
    - Genus: Asellia
      - Trident leaf-nosed bat, Asellia tridens LC

== Order: Cetacea (whales) ==
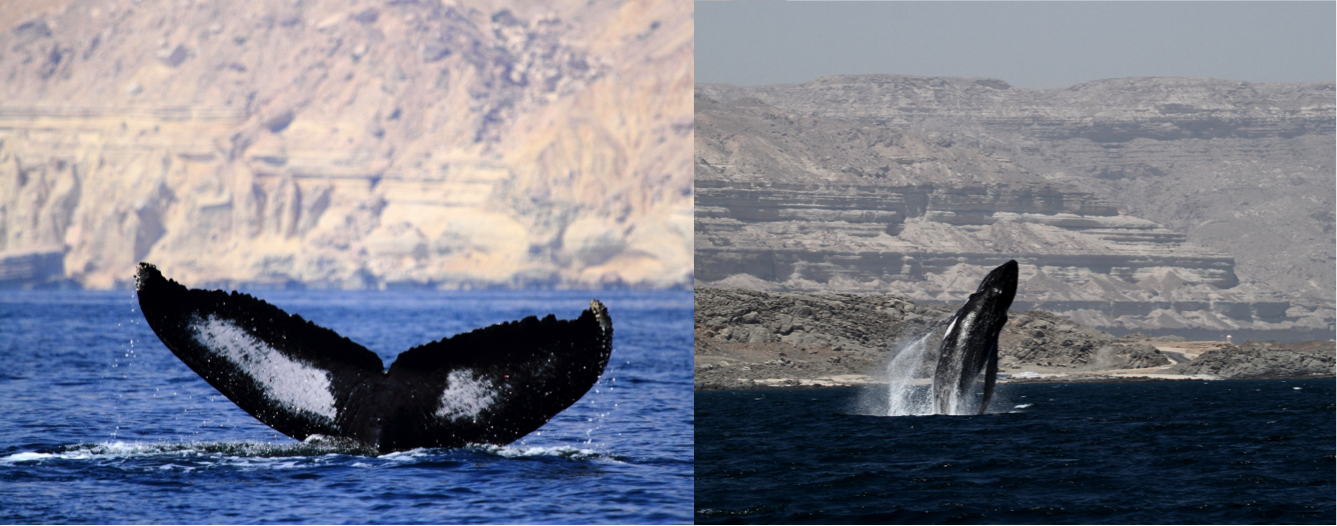
Arabian humpback whales off Dhofar, Oman

The order Cetacea includes whales, dolphins and porpoises. They are the mammals most fully adapted to aquatic life with a spindle-shaped nearly hairless body, protected by a thick layer of blubber, and forelimbs and tail modified to provide propulsion underwater.

- Suborder: Mysticeti
  - Family: Balaenopteridae (baleen whales)
    - Genus: Balaenoptera
      - Bryde's whale, Balaenoptera brydei LC
    - Genus: Megaptera
      - Humpback whale, M. novaeangliae LC
- Suborder: Odontoceti
  - Superfamily: Platanistoidea
    - Family: Phocoenidae
      - Genus: Neophocaena
        - Finless porpoise, Neophocaena phocaenoides VU
    - Family: Physeteridae
      - Genus: Physeter
        - Sperm whale, Physeter macrocephalus VU
    - Family: Ziphiidae
      - Subfamily: Hyperoodontinae
        - Genus: Ziphius
          - Cuvier's beaked whale, Ziphius cavirostris LC
    - Family: Delphinidae (marine dolphins)
      - Genus: Delphinus
        - Common dolphin, Delphinus capensis LC
      - Genus: Grampus
        - Risso's dolphin, Grampus griseus DD
      - Genus: Lagenodelphis
        - Fraser's dolphin, Lagenodelphis hosei LC
      - Genus: Stenella
        - Striped dolphin, Stenella coeruleoalba LC
      - Genus: Steno
        - Rough-toothed dolphin, Steno bredanensis LC
      - Genus: Sousa
        - Indo-Pacific humpbacked dolphin, Sousa chinensis EN
      - Genus: Orcinus
        - Orca, O. orca DD
      - Genus: Pseudorca
        - False killer whale, Pseudorca crassidens NT
      - Genus: Tursiops
        - Indo-Pacific bottlenose dolphin, Tursiops aduncus NT
        - Common bottlenose dolphin, Tursiops truncatus LC

== Order: Carnivora (carnivorans) ==
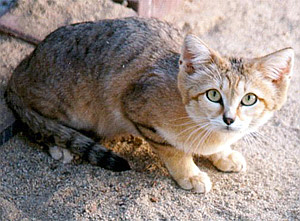
Sand cat

There are over 260 species of carnivorans, the majority of which feed primarily on meat. They have a characteristic skull shape and dentition.

- Suborder: Feliformia
  - Family: Felidae (cats)
    - Subfamily: Felinae
      - Genus: Felis
        - Sand cat, F. margarita LC presence uncertain
  - Family: Herpestidae (mongooses)
    - Genus: Urva
      - Indian gray mongoose, U. edwardsii LC
  - Family: Hyaenidae (hyaenas)
    - Genus: Hyaena
      - Striped hyena, H. hyaena NT presence uncertain
- Suborder: Caniformia
  - Family: Canidae (dogs, foxes)
    - Genus: Canis
      - Golden jackal, C. aureus LC
    - Genus: Vulpes
      - Rüppell's fox, V. rueppellii LC
      - Red fox, V. vulpes LC
  - Family: Mustelidae (mustelids)
    - Genus: Mellivora
      - Honey badger, M. capensis LC

== Order: Artiodactyla (even-toed ungulates) ==
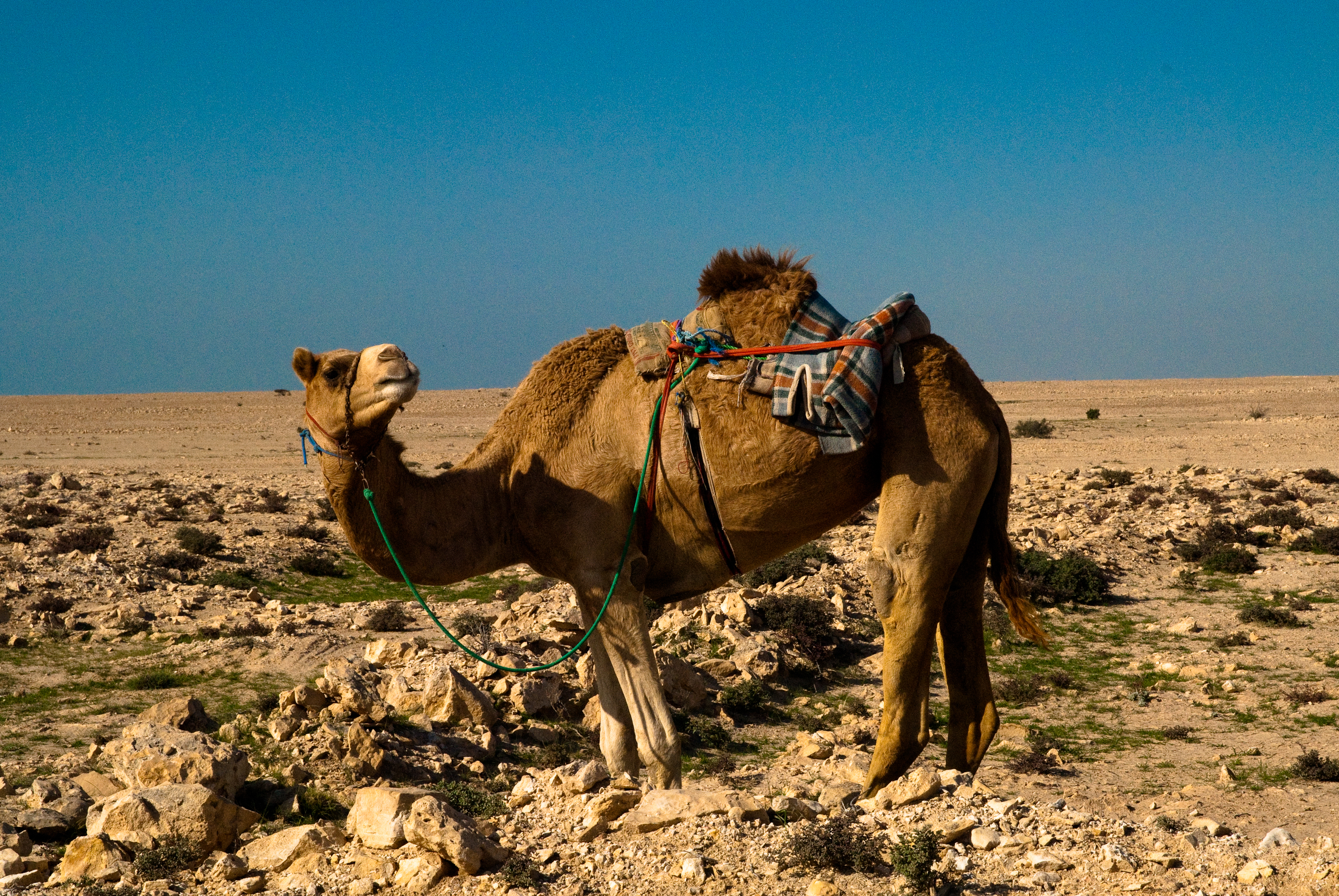
Dromedary in northern Qatar

The even-toed ungulates are ungulates whose weight is borne about equally by the third and fourth toes, rather than mostly or entirely by the third as in perissodactyls. There are about 220 artiodactyl species, including many that are of great economic importance to humans.

- Family: Bovidae (cattle, antelope, sheep, goats)
  - Subfamily: Antilopinae
    - Genus: Gazella
      - Arabian sand gazelle, Gazella marica VU
  - Subfamily: Hippotraginae
    - Genus: Oryx
      - Arabian oryx, Oryx leucoryx VU reintroduced

== See also ==
- Wildlife of Qatar
- List of chordate orders
- Lists of mammals by region
- List of prehistoric mammals
- Mammal classification
- List of mammals described in the 2000s
