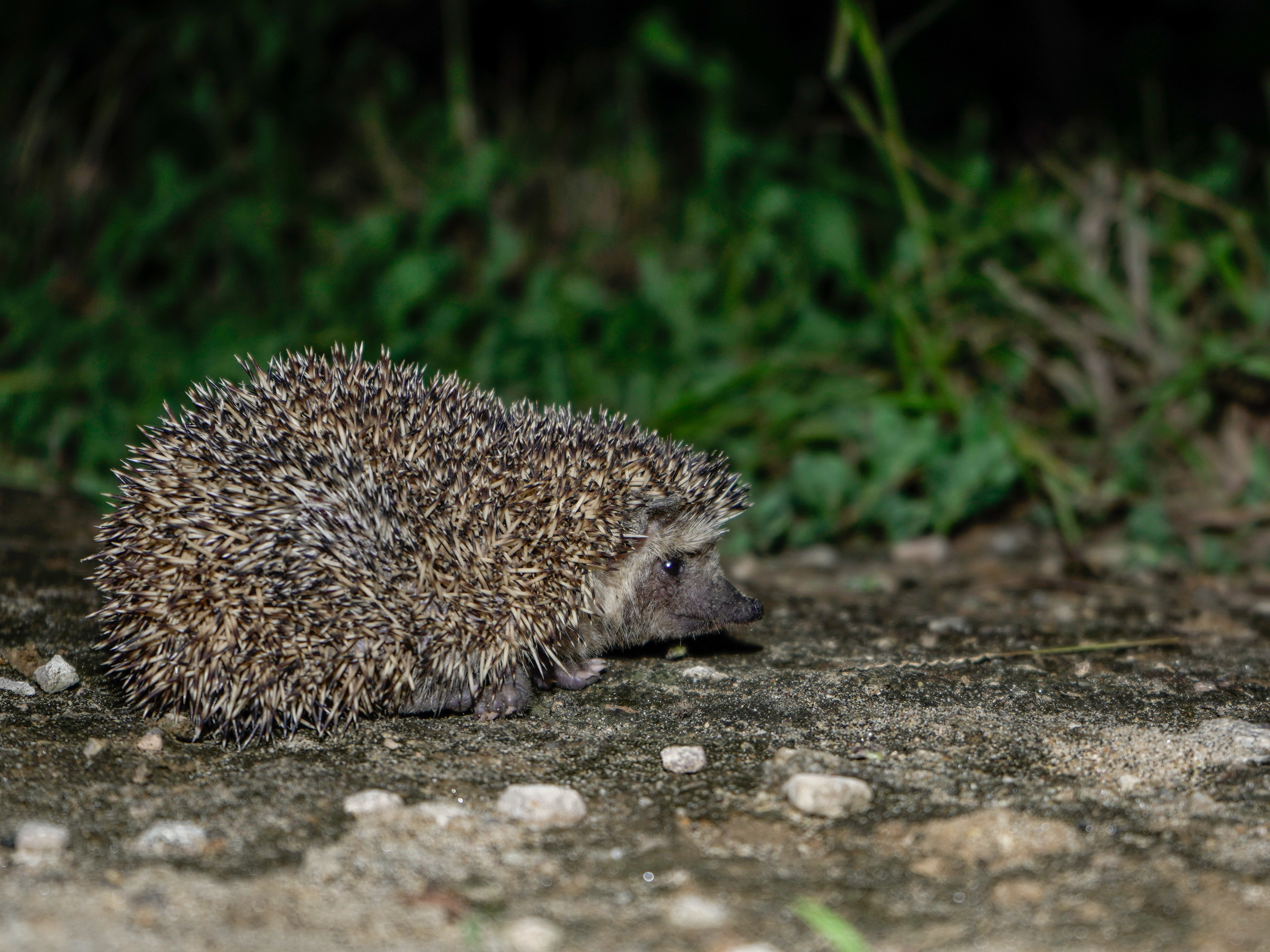

Conservation status
- Least Concern (IUCN 3.1)

Scientific classification
- Kingdom: Animalia
- Phylum: Chordata
- Class: Mammalia
- Order: Eulipotyphla
- Family: Erinaceidae
- Genus: Paraechinus
- Species: P. nudiventris

Binomial name
- Paraechinus nudiventris (Horsfield, 1851)
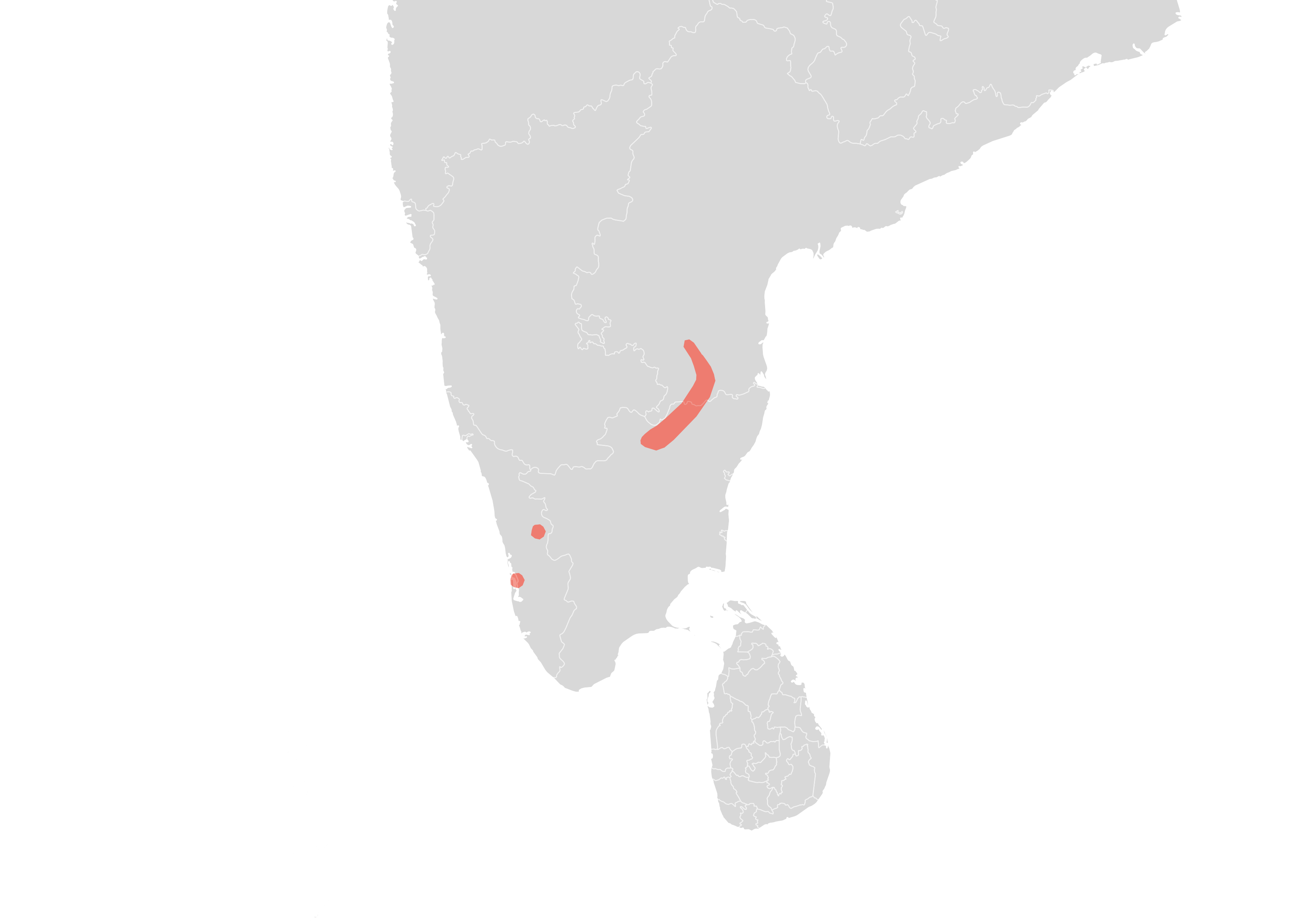
- Distribution of bare-bellied hedgehog

= Bare-bellied hedgehog =

Species of mammal

The bare-bellied hedgehog (Paraechinus nudiventris), also known as the Madras hedgehog, is a species of hedgehog that is endemic to dry arid regions and scrubby jungles in southeastern India. As it was believed to be rare, it was formerly listed as Vulnerable by the IUCN. It is now known to be locally common in the Indian states of Andhra Pradesh and Tamil Nadu, mostly in Erode and Tirupur, resulting in its new listing as a species of Least Concern. Hedgehogs are protected species under schedule IV of Wildlife Protection Act (1972).

It was also found in Kottayam and Palakkad districts of Kerala.

Madras hedgehogs are hunted locally in India for subsistence food and medicinal purposes. They are wildly perceived to be a cure for tuberculosis and asthma, as well as offer relief against coughs.

== Characteristics ==
The bare-bellied hedgehog has a head to body length 14–25 cm (5.5–9.8 in), a short tail of 1–3 cm (0.39–1.18 in), and weighs 310–435 g (10.9–15.3 oz). It reaches sexual maturity in about 10 months and gives birth to 4-6 young per litter.

== See also ==
Indian hedgehog
