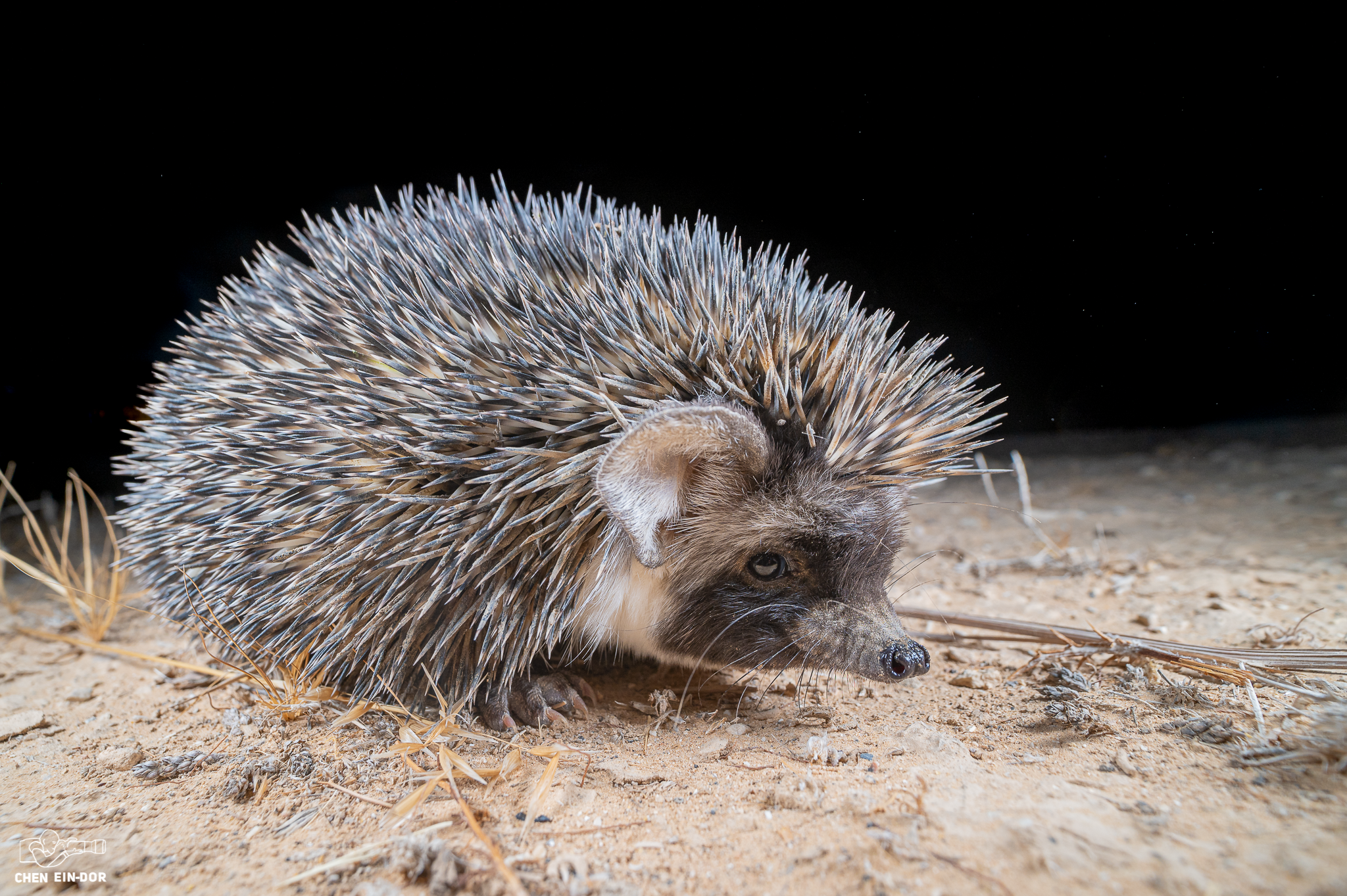

Conservation status
- Least Concern (IUCN 3.1)

Scientific classification
- Kingdom: Animalia
- Phylum: Chordata
- Class: Mammalia
- Order: Eulipotyphla
- Family: Erinaceidae
- Genus: Paraechinus
- Species: P. aethiopicus

Binomial name
- Paraechinus aethiopicus (Ehrenberg, 1832)
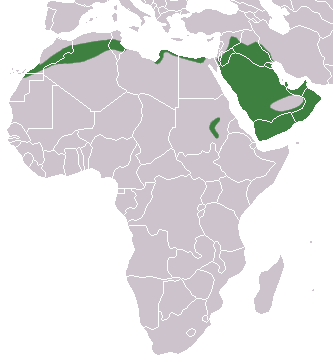
- Desert hedgehog range

= Desert hedgehog =

Species of mammal

The desert hedgehog (Paraechinus aethiopicus) is a species of mammal in the family Erinaceidae.

== Description ==
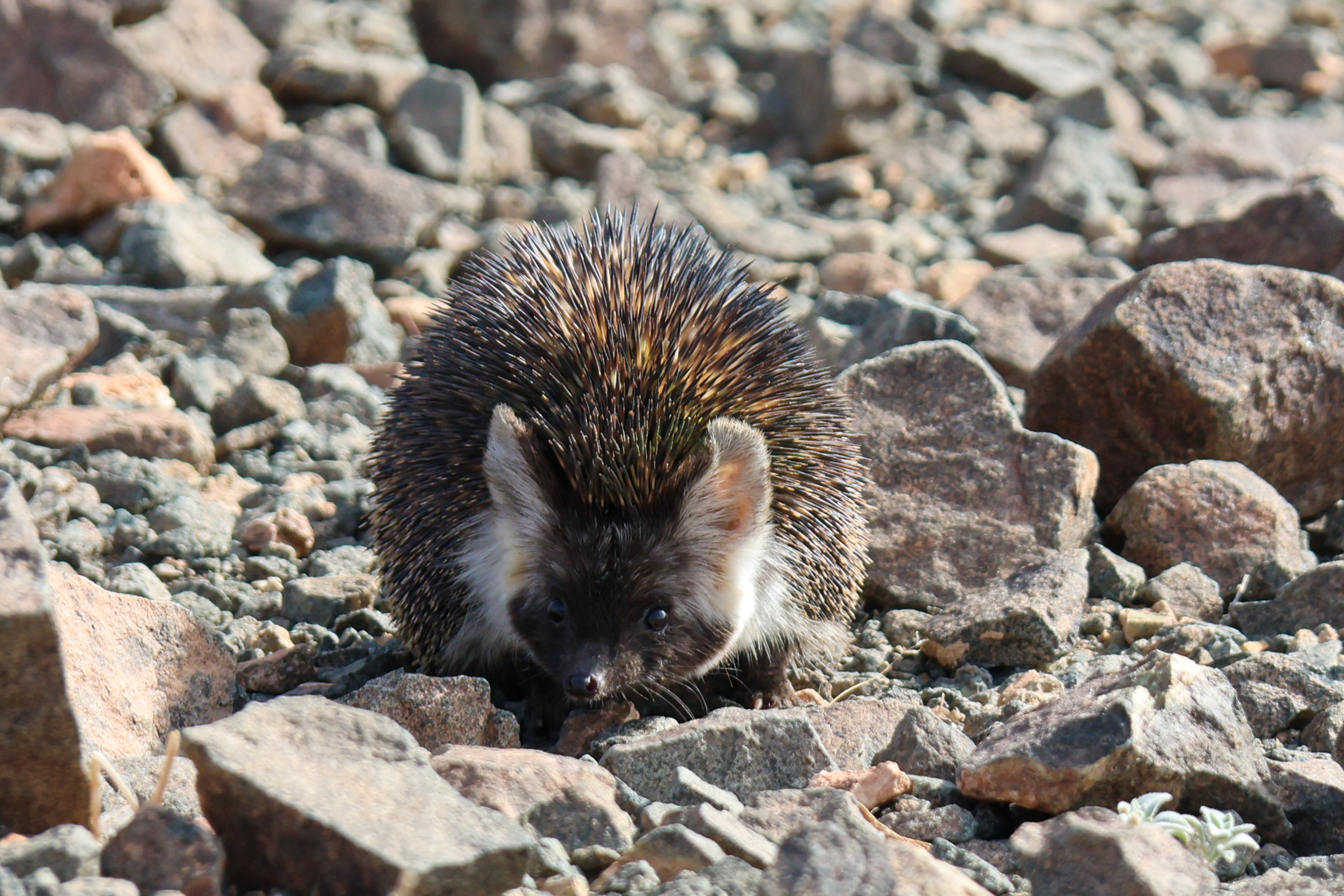
Desert hedgehog in eastern Saudi Arabia

The desert hedgehog is one of the smallest hedgehogs. It is 140 to 280 mm (5.5 to 11 in) long and weighs about 280 to 510 g (10 to 18 oz). The spines on its back can be banded with coloring similar to the four-toed hedgehog. It is usually identified by its dark muzzle. If desert hedgehogs are threatened, their muscles go tight and pull the outer layer of skin around the body, making their quills stick out in all directions. The spines have been theorized to aid in defense, but research has shown that this is likely incidental. Rather, the spines do not break in the manner of porcupine quills, but instead bend. The spines are also able to absorb mechanical energy, providing protection from fall damage.

== Distribution ==
The desert hedgehog occurs in Bahrain, Algeria, Chad, Djibouti, Egypt, Eritrea, Iran, Iraq, Israel, Jordan, Kuwait, Libya, Mali, Mauritania, Morocco, Niger, Oman, Saudi Arabia, Somalia, Sudan, Syria, Tunisia, United Arab Emirates, Yemen, and possibly Ethiopia.

== Behaviour and ecology ==
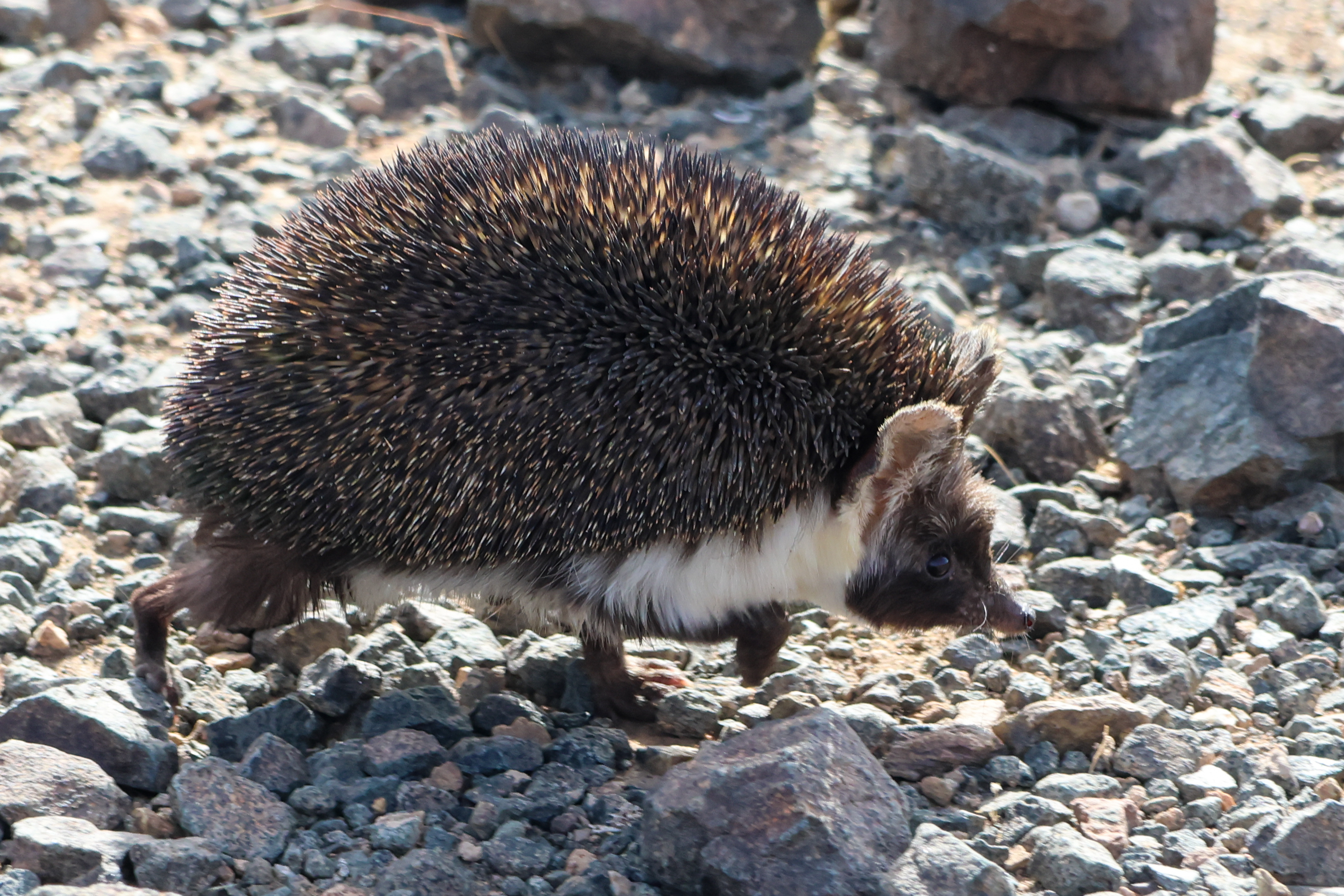
Desert hedgehog in Saudi Arabia

Breeding begins in March, after hibernation has ended. The female desert hedgehog gives birth to up to six young, in a burrow or concealed nest, after a gestation period of around 30 to 40 days. The young are born deaf and blind, and with the quills located just under the skin, to prevent damage to the female during birth. The quills emerge within a few hours, and the eyes open after around 21 days. The young desert hedgehogs are weaned after about 40 days. There is thought to be a single litter each year.

=== Health ===
The desert hedgehog is a host of the Acanthocephalan intestinal parasite Moniliformis saudi.

== Threats ==
The desert hedgehog is reported to be a common species with a wide distribution and a large population. It is thought to be reasonably tolerant of habitat modification, and is not considered globally threatened. No major threats are reported for the species, although some note that increasing desertification within its range may be leading to the fragmentation of its populations, and in some areas it may suffer increased mortality due to road traffic.
