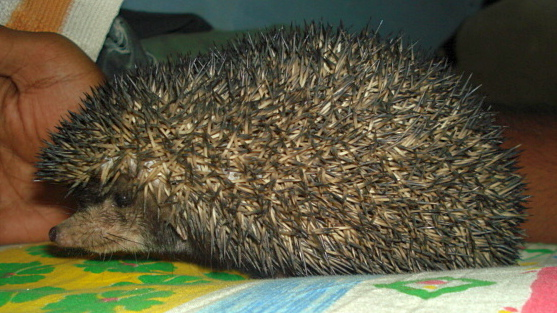

Conservation status
- Least Concern (IUCN 3.1)

Scientific classification
- Kingdom: Animalia
- Phylum: Chordata
- Class: Mammalia
- Order: Eulipotyphla
- Family: Erinaceidae
- Genus: Paraechinus
- Species: P. micropus

Binomial name
- Paraechinus micropus (Blyth, 1846)
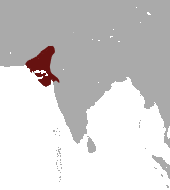
- Indian hedgehog range

= Indian hedgehog =

Species of mammal

The Indian hedgehog (Paraechinus micropus) is a species of hedgehog native to India and Pakistan. It mainly lives in sandy desert areas but can be found in other environments.

== Description ==
The Indian hedgehog can be compared to the long-eared hedgehog (Hemiechinus auritus) which has a similar lifestyle and appearance. It is known for its masked face, dark with a white top, somewhat similar to a raccoon. It is relatively small with the adult male weighing about 435 grams and the adult female about 312. They are quite fast, although not as fast as the long-eared hedgehog. Its color is predominantly brown with a few lighter shades of brown. The tail is only about 2-4 centimeters long. It has a stocky body with a short head, a long snout, small, dark eyes, and relatively large ears. Its legs are a gray-brown color with 5 digits on each and small but strong claws. Hedgehogs are protected species under Schedule IV of Wildlife Protection Act (1972). Indian hedgehogs also have a lot of acid phosphatase in their medulla oblongata and pons which can affect the way their blood capillaries work in the brain. Their brains also have a lot of enzyme activity going on because of the presence of acetylcholinesterase

== Behavior ==
Being a part of the family Erinaceidae, the Indian hedgehog has a very diverse diet consuming insects (preferably beetles), worms, slugs, frogs, toads, bird eggs, snakes, and scorpions. Although it doesn't hibernate, it is still capable of slowing down its metabolism when food is scarce. When danger presents itself, the Indian hedgehog rolls up into a ball. The upper side of the body has spines to protect from predators. The Indian hedgehog is capable of digging burrows about 45 cm long. They use these to sleep in and to stay hidden from danger. Any open burrow is fair game and they inhabit any that are vacant. Like all hedgehogs, these animals go through a process called self-anointing. They spread their own saliva on their spines and fur after tasting or smelling something that is unfamiliar to them. This behavior occurs in both sexes, at all ages, and at any time of the year.

== Reproduction ==
Male and female Indian hedgehogs meet only to breed and reproduce. The female gives birth to up to three cubs and raises them on her own without the help of the male.

== Predators ==
The known predators of Indian hedgehogs include foxes, Indian grey mongooses (Herpestes edwardsi), and rock-horned owls (Bubo bubo turcomanus). Predators have to be quick and resourceful to snatch the hedgehog before it curls up into its prickly ball.
