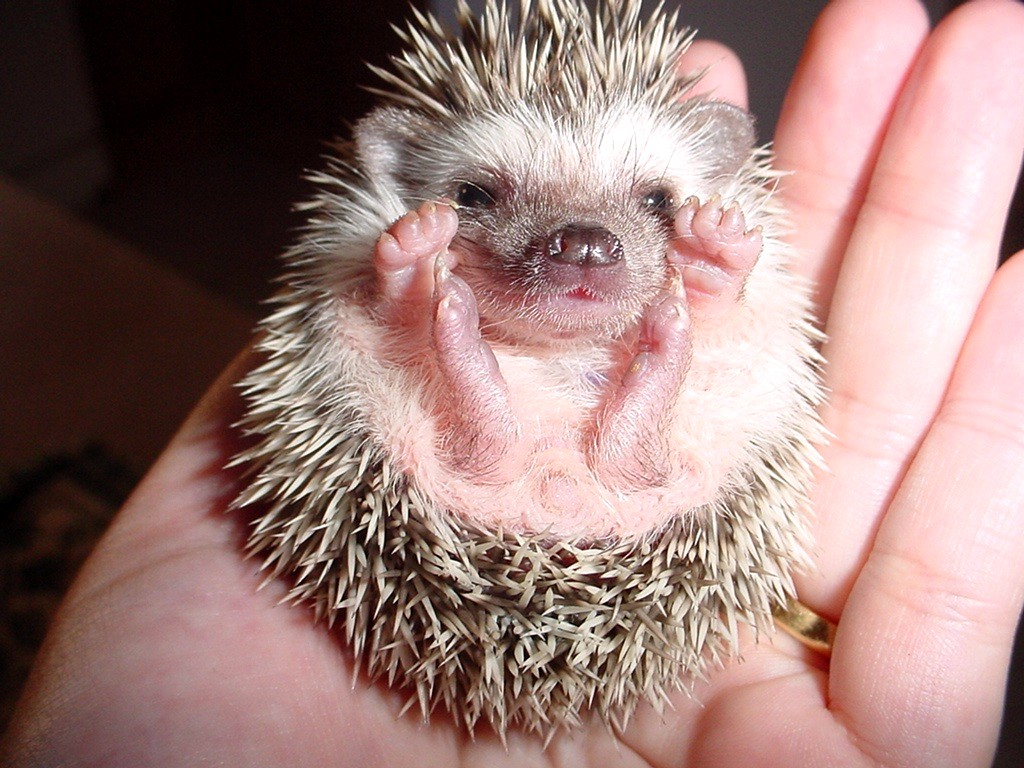
- P. aethiopicus

Scientific classification
- Kingdom: Animalia
- Phylum: Chordata
- Class: Mammalia
- Order: Eulipotyphla
- Family: Erinaceidae
- Subfamily: Erinaceinae
- Genus: Paraechinus; Trouessart, 1879

Type species
- Erinaceus micropus Blyth, 1846

Species
- P. aethiopicus P. hypomelas P. micropus P. nudiventris

= Paraechinus =

Genus of mammals

Paraechinus is a genus of hedgehogs. Members are small and nocturnal. The genus contains four species from North Africa, the Middle East and South Asia:

- Desert hedgehog (Paraechinus aethiopicus)
- Brandt's hedgehog (Paraechinus hypomelas)
- Indian hedgehog (Paraechinus micropus)
- Bare-bellied hedgehog (Paraechinus nudiventris)

== Locomotory activity patterns ==
The locomotory activity of the Desert hedgehog (Paraechinus aethiopicus) occurred during the dark phases of both long and short day cycles. Therefore this species is considered nocturnal.

The Paraechinus hypomelas hypomelas is distributed throughout mainland Iran to the western side of the Indus River in Pakistan, suggesting the presence of a single subspecies Paraechinus hypomelas niger from the entire Arabian Peninsula. Paraechinus hypomelas blanfordi could potentially be considered a new sub-species because it deviates from the rest of them.
