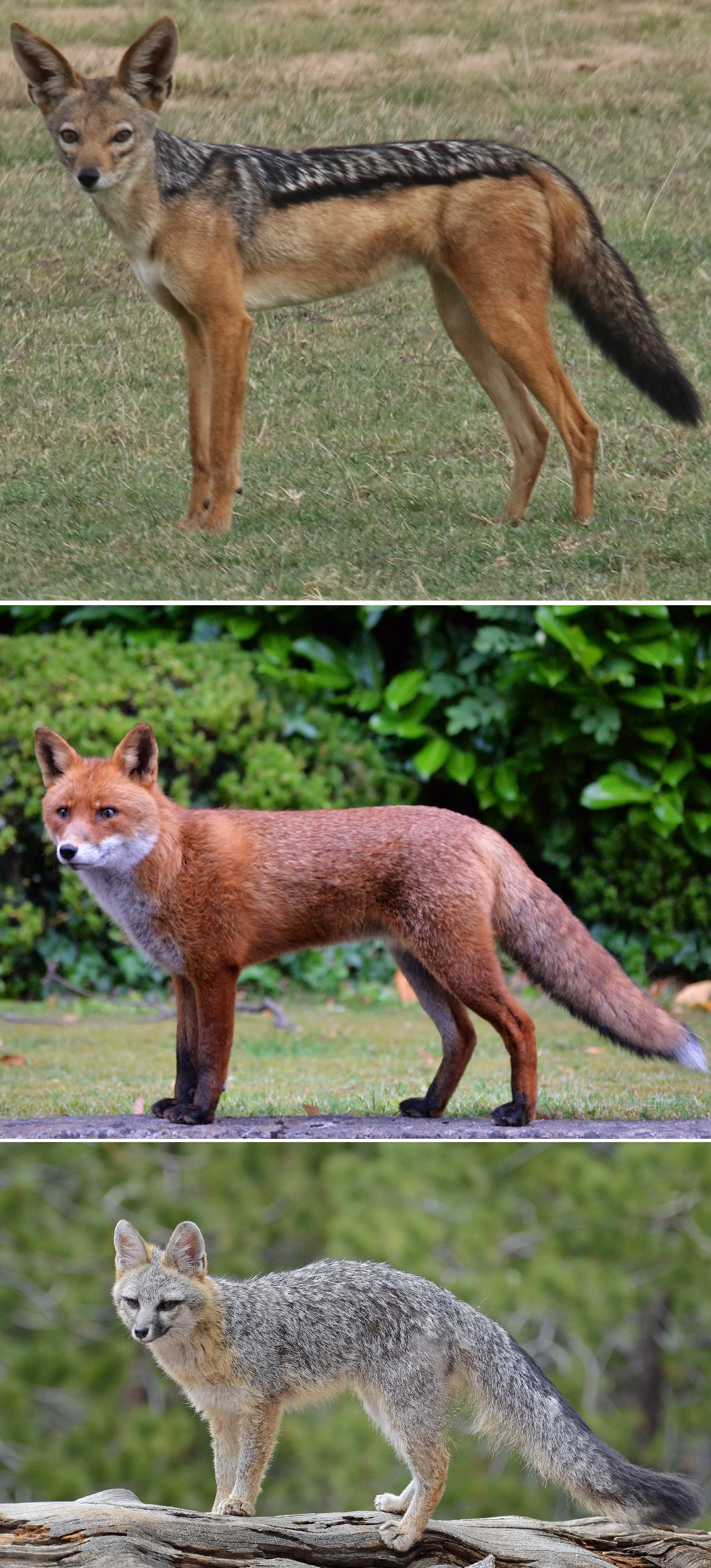
- The three extant canine tribes: tribe Canini, the dog-like canines (represented by a black-backed jackal); tribe Vulpini, the fox-like canines (represented by a red fox); and tribe Urocyonini, represented by a gray fox.

Scientific classification
- Kingdom: Animalia
- Phylum: Chordata
- Class: Mammalia
- Order: Carnivora
- Family: Canidae
- Subfamily: Caninae; Fischer de Waldheim, 1817

Genera and subgenera
- †Leptocyon; Tribe Urocyonini; Urocyon; Tribe Canini; Subtribe Canina; Canis; †Xenocyon; Cuon; Lupulella; Lycaon; †Cynotherium; †Aenocyon; †Eucyon; †Mececyon; †Megacyon; Subtribe Cerdocyonina; Atelocynus; Cerdocyon; Chrysocyon; Lycalopex; Speothos; †Dusicyon; †Nurocyon; †Protocyon; †Theriodictis; Tribe Vulpini; Nyctereutes; Otocyon; Vulpes; †Prototocyon; †Metalopex Tedford, Wang, & Taylor 2008
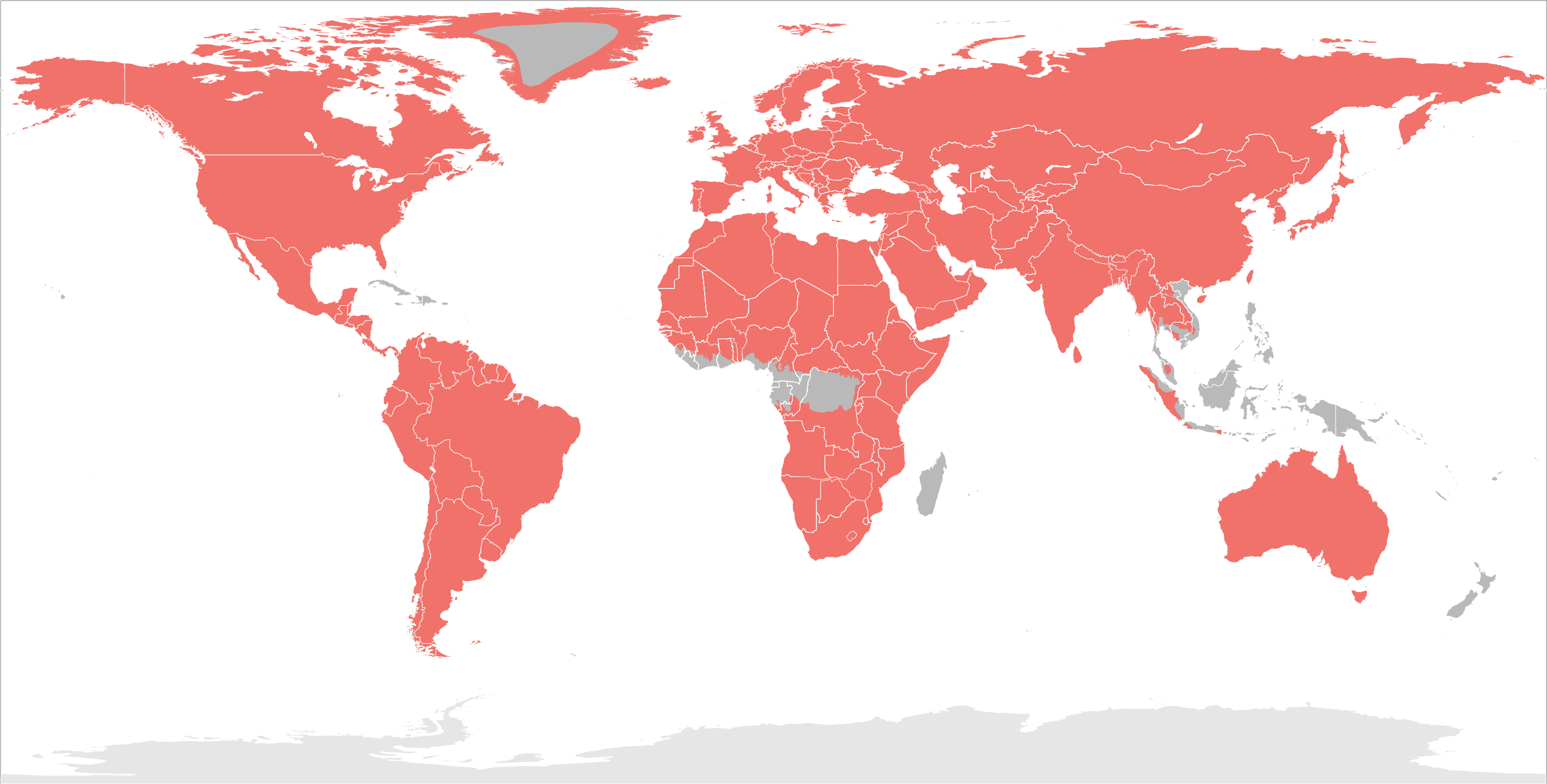
- Caninae distribution

= Caninae =

Canines Temporal range: Oligocene to Holocene (34 Ma-present) 34–0 Ma

Subfamily of carnivores

Caninae, whose members are known as canines (/keɪnaɪnz/), is the only extant subfamily within Canidae, and includes wolves, dogs, jackals, coyotes and foxes. They first appeared in North America during the Oligocene around 35 million years ago alongside the extinct sister taxa Borophaginae and Hesperocyoninae, and subsequently spreading to Eurasia and elsewhere in the Old World at the end of the Miocene, some 7 million to 8 million years ago.

== Taxonomy and lineage ==
Canid subfamilies

- Canidae
  - †Hesperocyoninae
  - - †Borophaginae
    - Caninae

The genus Leptocyon (Greek: leptos slender + cyon dog) includes 11 species and was the first primitive canine. They were small and weighed around 2 kg. They first appeared in Sioux County, Nebraska in the Orellan era 34-32 million years ago, which was the beginning of the Oligocene. This was the same time as the appearance of the Borophaginae with whom they share features, indicating that these were two sister groups. Borophaginae skull and dentition were designed for a powerful killing bite compared with the Leptocyon which were designed for snatching small, fast-moving prey. The species L. delicatus is the smallest canid to have existed. At the close of their genus 9 million years ago one Leptocyon lineage resembled the modern fox. The various species of Leptocyon branched 11.9 Mya into Vulpini (foxes) and Canini (canines).

The canines spent two-thirds of their history in North America, before dispersing 7 million years ago into Asia, Europe, and Africa. One of the characteristics that distinguished them from the Borophaginae and Hesperocyoninae was their possession of less weight in their limbs and more length in their legs, which may have aided their dispersion. The first canine to arrive in Eurasia was the coyote-sized Canis cipio, whose scant fossils were found in Spain. However, the assignment of C. cipio within the canines to the genus Canis or genus Eucyon is not clear.

== Phylogenetic relationships ==
The results of allozyme and chromosome analyses have previously suggested several phylogenetic divisions:

| Divisions | Description | Image | Genus | Species |
|---|---|---|---|---|
| Subtribe Canina | The wolf and wolf-like canines | | Canis Linnaeus, 1758 | Canis aureus; Canis familiaris; Canis latrans; Canis lupaster; Canis lupus; Canis rufus; Canis lycaon; Canis simensis; † Canis antonii; † Canis armbrusteri; † Canis chihliensis; † Canis edwardii; † Canis etruscus; † Canis falconeri; † Canis mosbachensis; † Canis palmidens; † Canis variabilis; † Canis vitastensis |
| Subtribe Canina | The wolf and wolf-like canines | | Cuon Hodgson, 1838 | Cuon alpinus |
| Subtribe Canina | The wolf and wolf-like canines | | Lycaon Brookes, 1827 | Lycaon pictus; †Lycaon sekowei |
| Subtribe Canina | The wolf and wolf-like canines | | Lupulella Hilzheimer, 1906 | Lupulella adusta; Lupulella mesomelas |
| Subtribe Cerdocyonina | The South American canines | | Speothos Lund, 1839 | Speothos venaticus; †Speothos pacivorus |
| Subtribe Cerdocyonina | The South American canines | | Lycalopex Burmeister 1854 | Lycalopex culpaeus; Lycalopex fulvipes; Lycalopex griseus; Lycalopex gymnocercus; Lycalopex sechurae; Lycalopex vetulus; †Lycalopex cultridens; †Lycalopex ensenadensis |
| Subtribe Cerdocyonina | The South American canines | | Cerdocyon C. E. H. Smith, 1839 | Cerdocyon thous |
| Subtribe Cerdocyonina | The South American canines | | Chrysocyon Smith, 1839 | Chrysocyon brachyurus |
| Subtribe Cerdocyonina | The South American canines | | Atelocynus Cabrera, 1940 | Atelocynus microtis |
| Tribe Vulpini | The fox-like canines | | Nyctereutes Temminck, 1838 | Nyctereutes procyonoides; Nyctereutes viverrinus; †Nyctereutes abdeslami; †Nyctereutes donnezani; †Nyctereutes lockwoodi; †Nyctereutes megamastoides; †Nyctereutes sinensis; †Nyctereutes tingi; †Nyctereutes vinetorum |
| Tribe Vulpini | The fox-like canines | | Otocyon S. Müller, 1835 | Otocyon megalotis |
| Tribe Vulpini | The fox-like canines | | Vulpes Garsault, 1764 | Vulpes bengalensis; Vulpes cana; Vulpes chama; Vulpes corsac; Vulpes ferrilata; Vulpes lagopus; Vulpes macrotis; Vulpes pallida; Vulpes rueppellii; Vulpes velox; Vulpes vulpes; Vulpes zerda; †Vulpes hassani; †Vulpes praeglacialis; †Vulpes qiuzhudingi; †Vulpes riffautae; †Vulpes rooki; †Vulpes skinneri; †Vulpes stenognathus |
| Genus Urocyon | Gray foxes | | Urocyon Baird, 1857 | U. cinereoargenteus; U. littoralis; † U. citrinus; † U. galushai; † U. minicephalus; † U. progressus; † U. webbi |

DNA analysis shows that the first three form monophyletic clades. The wolf-like canines and the South American canines together form the tribe Canini. Molecular data imply a North American origin of living Canidae some 10 Mya and an African origin of wolf-like canines (Canis, Cuon, and Lycaon), with the jackals being the most basal of this group.

The South American clade is rooted by the maned wolf and bush dog, and the fox-like canines by the fennec fox and Blanford's fox. The gray fox and island fox are basal to the other clades; however, this topological difference is not strongly supported.

The cladogram below is based on the phylogeny of Lindblad-Toh (2005) modified to incorporate recent findings on Canis, Vulpes, Lycalopex species, and Dusicyon.

- Caninae
  - - Canini
      - Canina
        - - - Canis
              - - - - - Canis latrans (coyote)
                      - - Canis rufus (red wolf)
                        - Canis lycaon (algonquin wolf)
                    - - Canis lupus (gray wolf)
                      - Canis familiaris (domestic dog)
                  - Canis anthus (African wolf)
                - Canis simensis (Ethiopian wolf)
              - Canis aureus (golden jackal)
            - Cuon alpinus (dhole)
          - Lycaon pictus (African wild dog)
        - Lupulella
          - Lupulella adusta (side-striped jackal)
          - Lupulella mesomelas (black-backed jackal)
      - Cerdocyonina
        - - Speothos venaticus (bush dog)
          - - Chrysocyon brachyurus (maned wolf)
            - †Dusicyon australis (Falkland Islands wolf)
        - - - - Lycalopex
                - Lycalopex vetulus (hoary fox)
                - - Lycalopex sechurae (Sechuran fox or Peruvian desert fox)
                  - - - Lycalopex fulvipes (Darwin's fox)
                      - Lycalopex gymnocercus (pampas fox)
                    - - Lycalopex griseus (South American gray fox or chilla)
                      - Lycalopex culpaeus (culpeo or Andean fox)
              - Cerdocyon thous (crab-eating fox)
            - Atelocynus microtis (short-eared dog)
    - Vulpini
      - Otocyon megalotis (bat-eared fox)
      - - Nyctereutes (raccoon dogs)
        - Vulpes
          - - Vulpes zerda (fennec fox)
            - Vulpes cana (Blanford's fox)
          - - Vulpes chama (Cape fox)
            - - - - Vulpes vulpes (red fox)
                  - Vulpes rueppellii (Ruppell's fox)
                - - Vulpes corsac (corsac fox)
                  - Vulpes ferrilata (Tibetan sand fox)
              - - Vulpes macrotis (kit fox)
                - Vulpes lagopus (Arctic fox)
  - Urocyon
    - Urocyon littoralis (island fox)
    - Urocyon cinereoargenteus (gray fox)
