= Sand fox =

Sand fox can refer to any of these animal species:

- Rüppell's fox
- Tibetan sand fox
