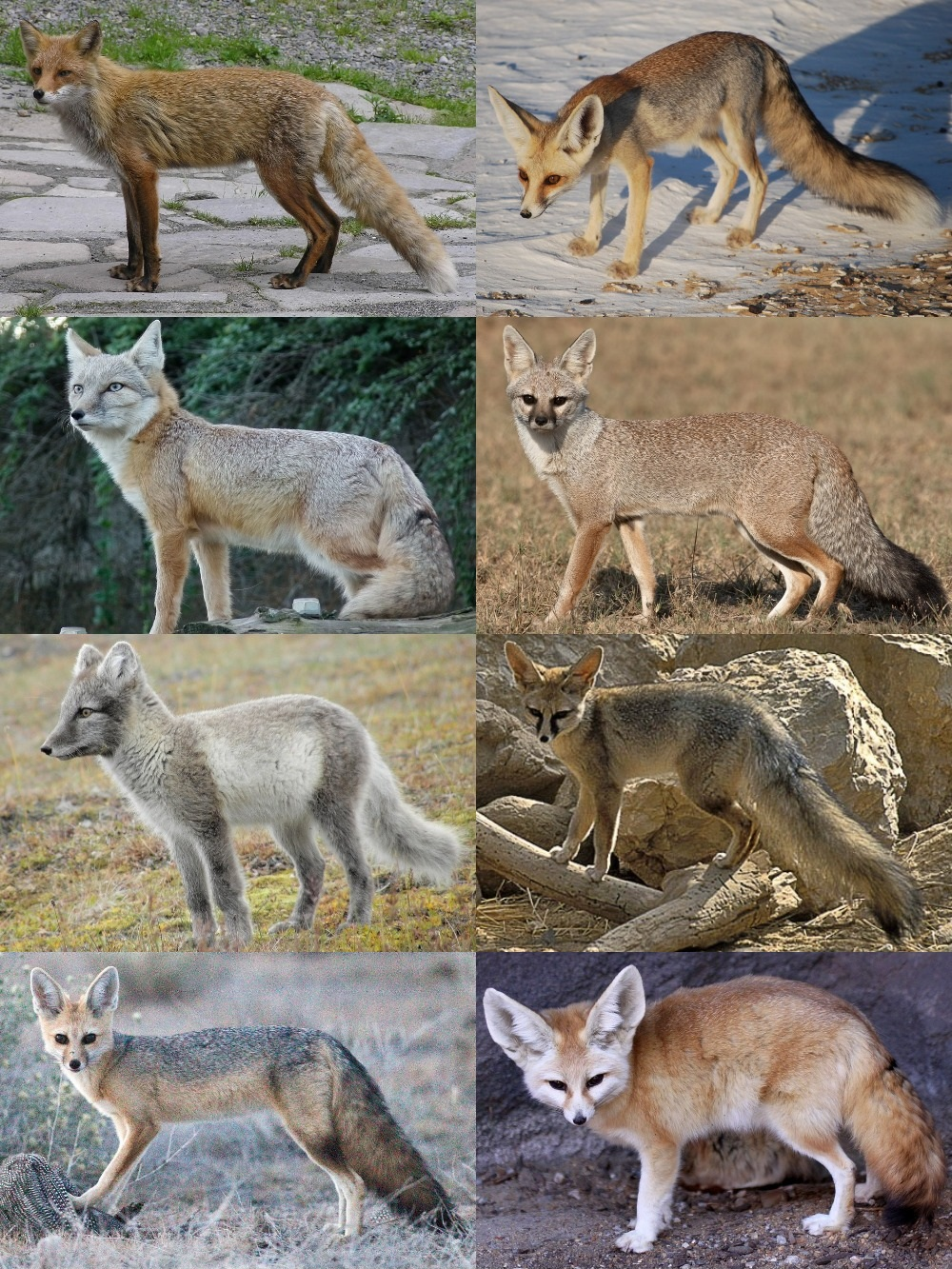
- Various true foxes: left to right, then top to bottom: red fox, Rüppell's fox, corsac fox, Bengal fox, Arctic fox, Blanford's fox, Cape fox, and fennec fox

Scientific classification
- Kingdom: Animalia
- Phylum: Chordata
- Class: Mammalia
- Order: Carnivora
- Family: Canidae
- Subfamily: Caninae
- Tribe: Vulpini
- Genus: Vulpes; Garsault, 1764

Type species
- Canis vulpes Linnaeus, 1758

Species
- Vulpes bengalensis; Vulpes cana; Vulpes chama; Vulpes corsac; Vulpes ferrilata; Vulpes lagopus; Vulpes macrotis; Vulpes pallida; Vulpes rueppellii; Vulpes velox; Vulpes vulpes; Vulpes zerda
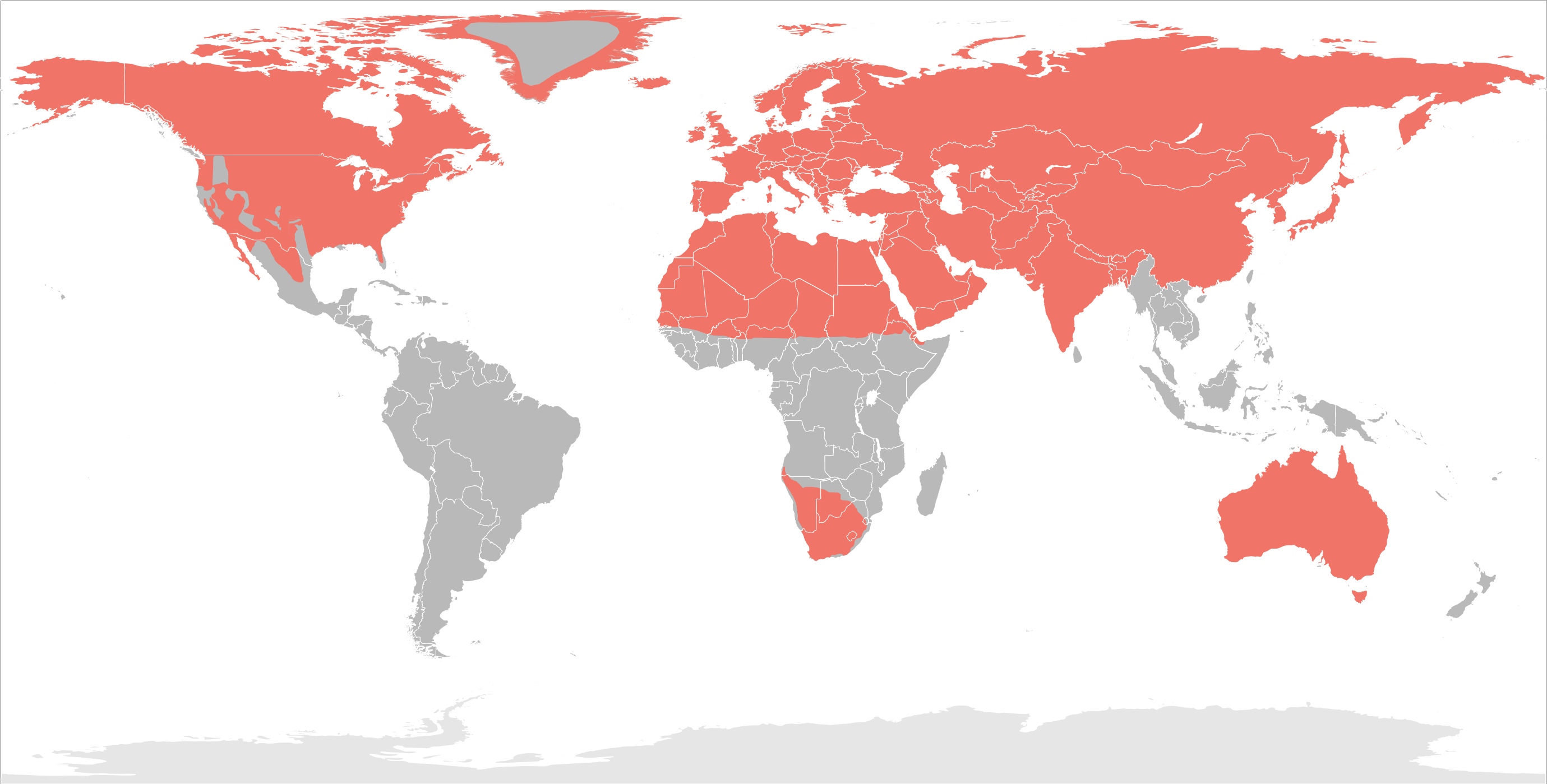
- Vulpes distribution

Synonyms
- Canis (in part); Alopex Kaup, 1829; Fennecus; Neocyon

= Vulpes =

Vulpes Temporal range: 7–0 Ma Late Miocene - Present

Genus of true foxes

Vulpes is a genus of the subfamily Caninae. The members of this genus are colloquially referred to as true foxes, meaning they form a proper clade. The word "fox" occurs in the common names of all species of the genus, but also appears in the common names of other canid species. True foxes are distinguished from members of the genus Canis, such as domesticated dogs, wolves, jackals and coyotes, by their smaller size (5–11 kg), longer, bushier tail, and flatter skull. They have black, triangular markings between their eyes and nose, and the tip of their tail is often a different color from the rest of their pelt. The typical lifespan for this genus is between two and four years, but can reach up to a decade.

== Extant species ==
Within Vulpes, 12 separate extant species and four fossil species are described:

Image	Scientific name	Common name	Distribution	Distribution map
	V. bengalensis	Bengal fox	Bengal foxes are endemic to the Indian subcontinent.	
	V. cana	Blanford's fox	Blanford's fox is native to the Middle East, including Iran, Palestine, Afghanistan, Egypt, and Pakistan. This species prefers semiarid environments.	
	V. chama	Cape fox	The Cape fox is only found in Southern Africa, including Zimbabwe, Botswana, and South Africa. They thrive in semiarid and arid environments with rich grasslands.	
	V. corsac	Corsac fox	Corsac foxes live in Central Asia. Like V. chama and V. cana, their natural habitat is semiarid deserts.	
	V. ferrilata	Tibetan fox	The Tibetan sand fox, as the name suggests, is endemic to the Tibetan and Ladakh plateau in Nepal, China, India, and Bhutan. This species lives at altitudes up to 5300 m.	
	V. lagopus	Arctic fox	Arctic foxes inhabit all of the Arctic Circle (Russia, Svalbard, Iceland, Fennoscandia, Greenland, Northern Canada, and Alaska).	
	V. macrotis	Kit fox	Kit foxes are an arid area-dwelling North American species. They are found in Oregon, Colorado, Nevada, Utah, California, Arizona, New Mexico, and Texas in the United States, as well as in Mexico.	
	V. pallida	Pale fox	The pale fox lives in the Sahel region in Africa, and is an arid area-dwelling species.	
	V. rueppellii	Rüppell's fox	Ruppell's foxes are found in North Africa and parts of the Middle East.	
	V. velox	Swift fox	The swift fox is found in the western grasslands of North America, specifically Montana, Wyoming, New Mexico, Colorado, Kansas, Oklahoma, and Texas, as well as the Canadian Prairies.	
	V. vulpes	Red fox	The red fox is the most abundant and most widely distributed species of Vulpes, occurring throughout the Northern Hemisphere (North America, Asia, and Europe). They also are present in Australia, though they were brought there by humans for fox hunting in the 1830s, and are considered an invasive species.	
	V. zerda	Fennec fox	The fennec fox lives in North Africa and the Sinai Peninsula.	

=== Phylogeny ===
The cladogram below is based on the phylogeny of Lindblad-Toh (2005) modified to incorporate recent findings on Vulpes.

The species of Vulpes within Vulpini
- Vulpini
  - Otocyon megalotis (Bat-eared fox)
  - - Nyctereutes (Raccoon dogs)
    - Vulpes
      - - Vulpes zerda (Fennec fox)
        - Vulpes cana (Blanford's fox)
      - - Vulpes chama (Cape fox)
        - - - - Vulpes vulpes (Red fox)
              - Vulpes rueppellii (Rüppell's fox)
            - - Vulpes corsac (Corsac fox)
              - Vulpes ferrilata (Tibetan fox)
          - - Vulpes macrotis (Kit fox)
            - Vulpes lagopus (Arctic fox)

== Early history ==
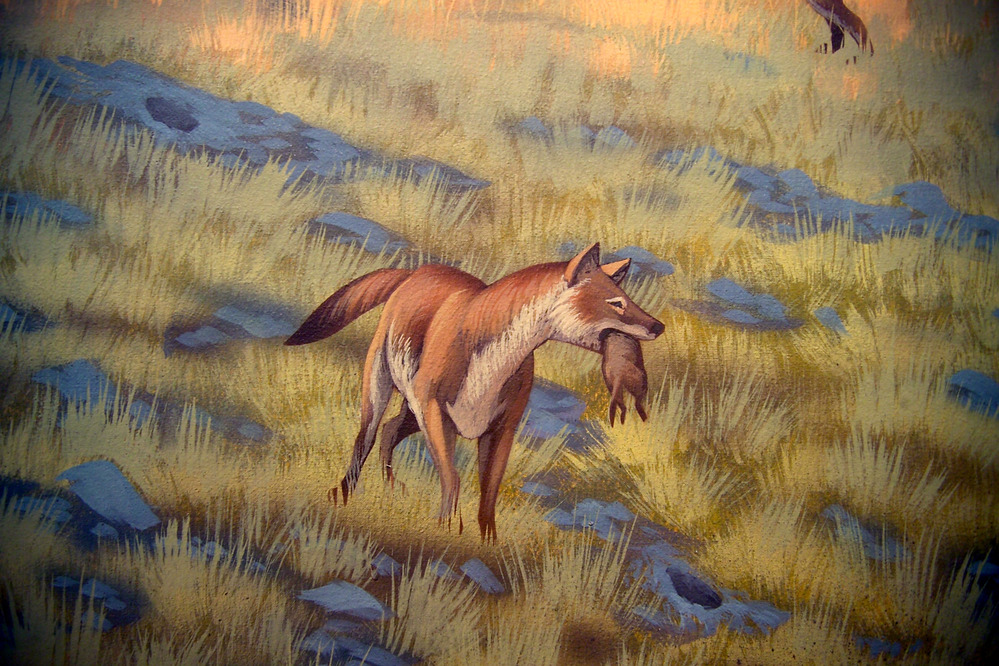
Artistic reconstruction of Vulpes stenognathus

The oldest known fossil species within Vulpes is V. riffautae, dating back to the late Miocene of Chad, which is within the Neogene. The deposits where these fossils are found are about 7 million years old, which might make them the earliest Canidae in the Old World. They are estimated to have weighed between 1.5 and 3.5 lb. V. skinneri, from the Malapa Fossil Site from South Africa, is younger than V. riffautae by roughly 5 million years, and shows up in the early Pleistocene.

Two other extinct, less documented fossils are known: V. praeglacialis and V. hassani. V. praeglacialis was discovered in the Petralona Cave in Chalkidiki, Greece. The age of the deposits (Early Pleistocene) makes it the earliest occurrence of Vulpes in Europe. V. hassani is found in a Miocene-Pliocene deposit in northwestern Africa. This species may have given rise to current Rüppell's fox, which lends support that the close phylogenetic clustering of Rüppels and Red foxes is the result of recent introgressive hybridization rather than recent speciation.

In the Pleistocene, Vulpes had a fairly wide distribution, with eight species found in North America. Of these eight, six are not fossil, and three species still remain in North America (V. velox, V. macrotis, and V. vulpes). The remaining three moved on to sections of Africa over time. V. stenognathus is extinct, but has extant sister taxa including V. chama, V. rueppellii, V. velox, and V. vulpes, which fits with these species all evolving together in North America.

=== Fossil species ===
- †Vulpes hassani
- †Vulpes odessana
- †Vulpes praeglacialis - Kormos (found in Petralona Cave, Greece)
- †Vulpes qiuzhudingi (2014)
- †Vulpes riffautae - Late Miocene
- †Vulpes rooki
- †Vulpes skinneri
- †Vulpes stenognathus

== Description ==
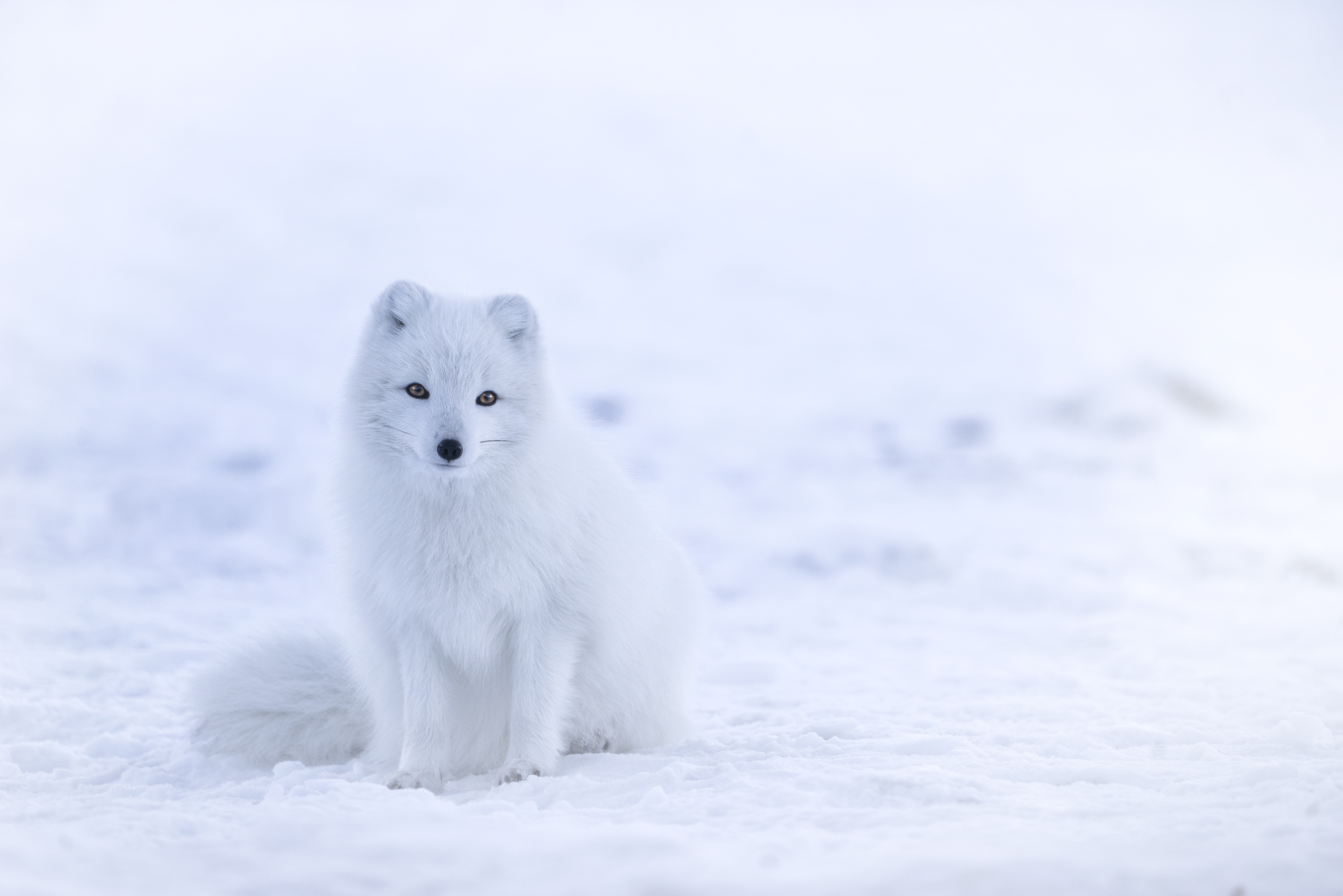
Arctic fox (Vulpes lagopus) in winter pelage.

True foxes are small to medium-sized animals, usually smaller than other canines, such as wolves, dogs, and jackals. For example, the largest species, the red fox, weighs on average 4.1–8.7 kg and the smallest species, the fennec fox, weighs only 0.7–1.6 kg. They have long, dense fur, and a bushy, rounded tail that is at least half as long, or fully as long as, the head and body. They have a rather long body with shorter limbs, a long, narrow muzzle, and large, pointed ears. The forelimbs have five toes, while the hind legs have only four. Their skulls tend to be light, slender and elongated with a weak or non-existent sagittal crest.

Vulpes species have vertically slit pupils, which generally appear elliptical in strong light like those of cats, which provide them with significant advantages. Like most canids, true foxes have a muscular body, powerful jaws, and teeth for grasping prey. Blunt claws are especially useful for gripping the ground while tracking down their prey. Some species have a pungent "foxy" odor, arising mainly from a gland located on the dorsal surface of the tail, not far from its base. Not much sexual dimorphism is displayed, although males are slightly larger.

In general, Vulpes has a bone structure very close to that of its canid relatives, but there are some variations. For example, although canid limbs are designed specifically for running quickly on land to catch prey, Vulpes species avoid rapid sprints, excluding when being chased, and have become more specialized for leaping and grasping prey. In Vulpes vulpes, for example, the adaptions for leaping, grasping, and climbing include the lengthening of hind limbs in relation to fore limbs, as well as overall slenderizing of both hind and fore limbs. Muscles are also emphasized along the axis of limbs.

The length, color and density of the fur of fox species differ. Fennec foxes (and other desert-adapted fox species such as Vulpes macrotis) have large ears and a short coat to keep the body cool. On the other hand, the Arctic fox has small ears and a thick, insulating coat to keep the body warm. A solid color coat is seen in most animals, but there are occasions where the coat color varies over the year to enhance camouflage against the current seasons landscape. The red fox, Ruppell's fox, and Tibetan sand fox possess white-tipped tails. The Arctic fox's tail-tip is of the same color as the rest of the tail (white or blue-gray). Blanford's fox usually possesses a black-tipped tail, but a small number of specimens (2% in Israel, 24% in the United Arab Emirates) possess a light-tipped tail. The other foxes in this group (Bengal, Cape, corsac, fennec, kit, pale, and swift) all possess black-tipped or dark-tipped tails.

== Distribution and habitat ==
The range of the genus is very wide, present in a wide variety of habitats, from the desert to the Arctic, and from high altitudes in the mountains to open plains. True foxes are opportunistic and thrive anywhere they can find food and shelter. They are also widespread in suburban and urban areas, where they can take advantage of human food supplies; however, they prefer to stay away from large industrial areas. In certain areas, foxes tend to do better where humans are present, including in many agricultural landscapes, forests and patchy woodlands.

== Behavior and ecology ==
Most true foxes are nocturnal, but they can be active during the morning and dusk and occasionally hunt and scavenge in daylight during winter. Many fox species are solitary or nomadic, living most of their lives on their own, except for the mating season, when they have a monogamous relationship with a partner. Some live in small family groups, others are more gregarious.

Vulpes have a high variation in social organization between species and populations. Their hierarchical society usually depends on population densities. As population density increases, there is also an increase in the formation of social groups. These groups consist of one dominant pair and a few other subordinate adults that tend to be related. Dominance is established within the den, and dominant kits have usually more access to food and often hold higher social status. If a dispute occurs, dominance is determined by fighting, and the loser may be rejected from its group. These social groups can consist of up to ten adults. Cape foxes likely have a matriarchal social organization.

=== Diet ===
This genus is omnivorous and prone to scavenging. The foods of choice for Vulpes consist of invertebrates, a variety of small vertebrates, grasses, and some angiosperms. The typical intake per day is about 1 kg. True foxes exhibit hoarding behavior or caching where they store away food for another day out of sight from other animals.

=== Predators ===
Adult foxes have very few predators except coyotes, bears, and wolves, depending on the location. Juvenile foxes face a wider range of threats from small carnivores and large birds of prey, such as eagles.

=== Reproduction ===
Most true foxes are monogamous. However, they can form polyandrous and polygynous pairs. Breeding season varies between species and habitat, but they generally breed between late December and late March. Most foxes dig out dens to provide a safe underground space for raising their young. Born deaf and blind, kits or cubs require their mother's milk and complete supervision for the first four to five weeks out of the womb, but begin to be progressively weaned after the first month. Once fully weaned, kits seek out various insects. The parents supplement this diet with a variety of mammals and birds. During early to middle July, the kits are able to hunt on their own and soon move away from their parents.

== Relationship with humans ==
=== Domestication ===
The silver fox is a melanistic form of the wild red fox. Though rare, domestication has been documented in silver foxes. The most notable experiment was conducted in Novosibirsk, Russia, at the Siberian Institute of Cytology and Genetics. In this study, generations of silver foxes were divided into those with friendly traits and those with unfriendly traits. After 50 years, the friendly foxes developed "dog-like" domesticated traits such as spots, tail wagging, enjoyment of human touch, and barking.

=== Fox hunting ===
Fox hunting was started in the United Kingdom in the 16th century that involves tracking, chasing, and killing a fox with the aid of foxhounds and horses. It has since then spread to Europe, the United States, and Australia.
