= Vulpes riffautae =

Vulpes riffautae Temporal range: late Miocene

Scientific classification
- Kingdom: Animalia
- Phylum: Chordata
- Class: Mammalia
- Order: Carnivora
- Family: Canidae
- Genus: Vulpes
- Species: †V. riffautae

Binomial name
- †Vulpes riffautae de Bonis et al., 2007

Extinct species of carnivore

Vulpes riffautae is an extinct species of fox from the late Miocene of Chad (approximately 7 ma). Fossils of V. riffautae potentially represent the earliest record of the dog family, Canidae, in the Old World. V. riffautae was intermediate in size between Rüppell's fox (Vulpes rueppellii) and the fennec fox (V. zerda). The mandible is narrow and shallow. Just before the posterior root of p2, the symphysis terminates. The masseteric fossa is rather deep. The posterior smaller mental foramen is located below the posterior root of p3, while the anterior larger mental foramen is located between the root of p1 and the anterior root of p2.
