= Vulpes qiuzhudingi =

Scientific classification
- Kingdom: Animalia
- Phylum: Chordata
- Class: Mammalia
- Order: Carnivora
- Family: Canidae
- Genus: Vulpes
- Species: †V. qiuzhudingi

Binomial name
- †Vulpes qiuzhudingi (Wang et al., 2014)

Synonyms
- Alopex qiuzhudingi

Extinct species of carnivore

Vulpes qiuzhudingi (also known as Tibetan Fox or Pliocene fox) is an extinct species of fox that lived during the Neogene period in the Himalayas. The fossils, dating from the Pliocene epoch between 5.08 and 3.60 million years ago, were discovered in the Zanda Basin and Kunlun Mountains of Tibet.

== Diet ==
It was primarily carnivorous. The species of this fox was likely predatorial; it might be from the few species of Vulpes that achieved true predator status, rather than being primarily omnivores. Its teeth have cusps, which is also seen in arctic foxes, and were well-designed to easily slice flesh.

== Naming ==
It was named after Qiu Zhuding, a paleontologist from the Chinese Academy of Sciences.

== Evolution ==
The species is believed to be the ancestor of Vulpes lagopus, the modern Arctic fox, which would support the "Out of Tibet" theory: namely, that a number of current Arctic species trace their ancestry to species that originally inhabited the Tibetan Plateau. It argues that some of the Ice Age megafauna used ancient Tibet as a "training ground" for developing adaptations, allowed them to cope with the severe climatic conditions.

== Living relative ==
In 2006, the researchers also found a single tooth in the Zanda Basin, but couldn't match it to a specific animal species. Over the next several years, they went on to find two other fossils that revealed the lower jaw and some of the teeth from ancient predatory foxes, allowing them to identify the original tooth as well. Leading V. qiuzhudingi to be the closest relative to the arctic fox.
