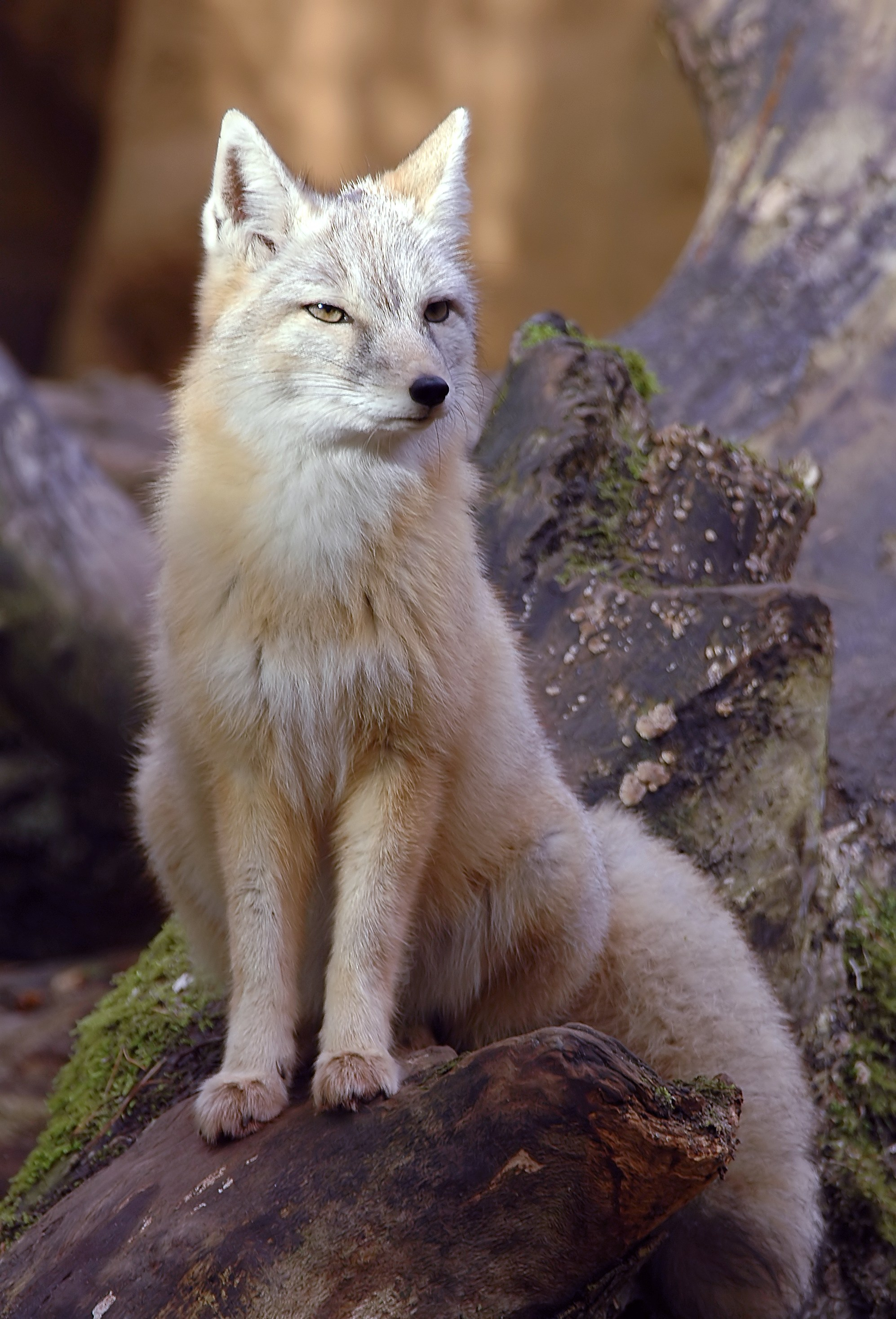

Conservation status
- Least Concern (IUCN 3.1)

Scientific classification
- Kingdom: Animalia
- Phylum: Chordata
- Class: Mammalia
- Order: Carnivora
- Family: Canidae
- Genus: Vulpes
- Species: V. corsac

Binomial name
- Vulpes corsac Linnaeus, 1768
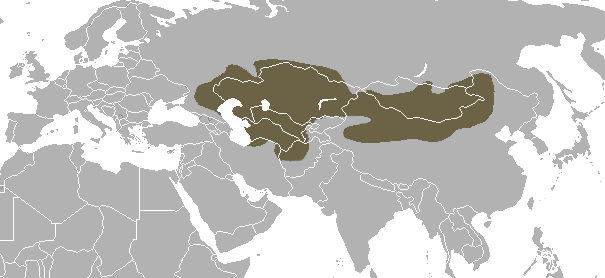
- Corsac fox range

Synonyms
- Canis corsac; Alopex corsac

= Corsac fox =

Species of carnivore

The Corsac fox (Vulpes corsac), also known as a corsac, is a medium-sized fox found in steppes, semi-deserts and deserts in Central Asia, ranging into Mongolia and northern China. Since 2004, it has been classified as least concern by IUCN, but populations fluctuate significantly, and numbers can drop tenfold within a single year. It is also known as the steppe fox. The word "corsac" is derived from the Russian name for the animal, "korsák" (корса́к), derived ultimately from Turkic "karsak".

== Description ==
The corsac fox is a medium-sized fox, with a head and body length of 45 to 65 cm (18 to 26 in), and a tail 19 to 35 cm (7.5 to 13.8 in) long. Adults weigh from 1.6 to 3.2 kilograms (3.5 to 7.1 lb). It has grey to yellowish fur over much of the body, with paler underparts and pale markings on the mouth, chin, and throat. During the winter, the coat becomes much thicker and silkier in texture, and is straw-grey in colour, with a darker line running down the back.

For a fox, it has small teeth and a wide skull. One source claims that this species can climb trees and has been domesticated in the past. It is reported to have keen eyesight and hearing and an acute sense of smell. It has a number of scent glands, some of which produce pungent odors, although not so extreme as those found in some other Vulpes species. The glands are found in the anal region, above the base of the tail, and on the paws and cheeks.

Corsac foxes are reported to bark during hunting or when threatening rivals, and to use higher pitch yelps or chirps as alarm calls or social greetings.

== Distribution and habitat ==
Corsac foxes live in the steppes and semidesert of central and northeast Asia. They are found throughout Kazakhstan, Uzbekistan, and Turkmenistan, and through all except the northernmost regions of Mongolia. In the south, their range extends into the more northern parts of Iran, Tajikistan, Kyrgyzstan, Afghanistan, and China, and they can also be found in neighbouring regions of Russia.

These foxes inhabit open grassy steppes and semideserts, and avoid dense vegetation and mountainous regions. True deserts with drifting sands are also avoided, as are snowfields more than about 15 cm (6 in) deep. Corsac foxes generally stay far away from human disturbances.

== Ecology and behavior ==
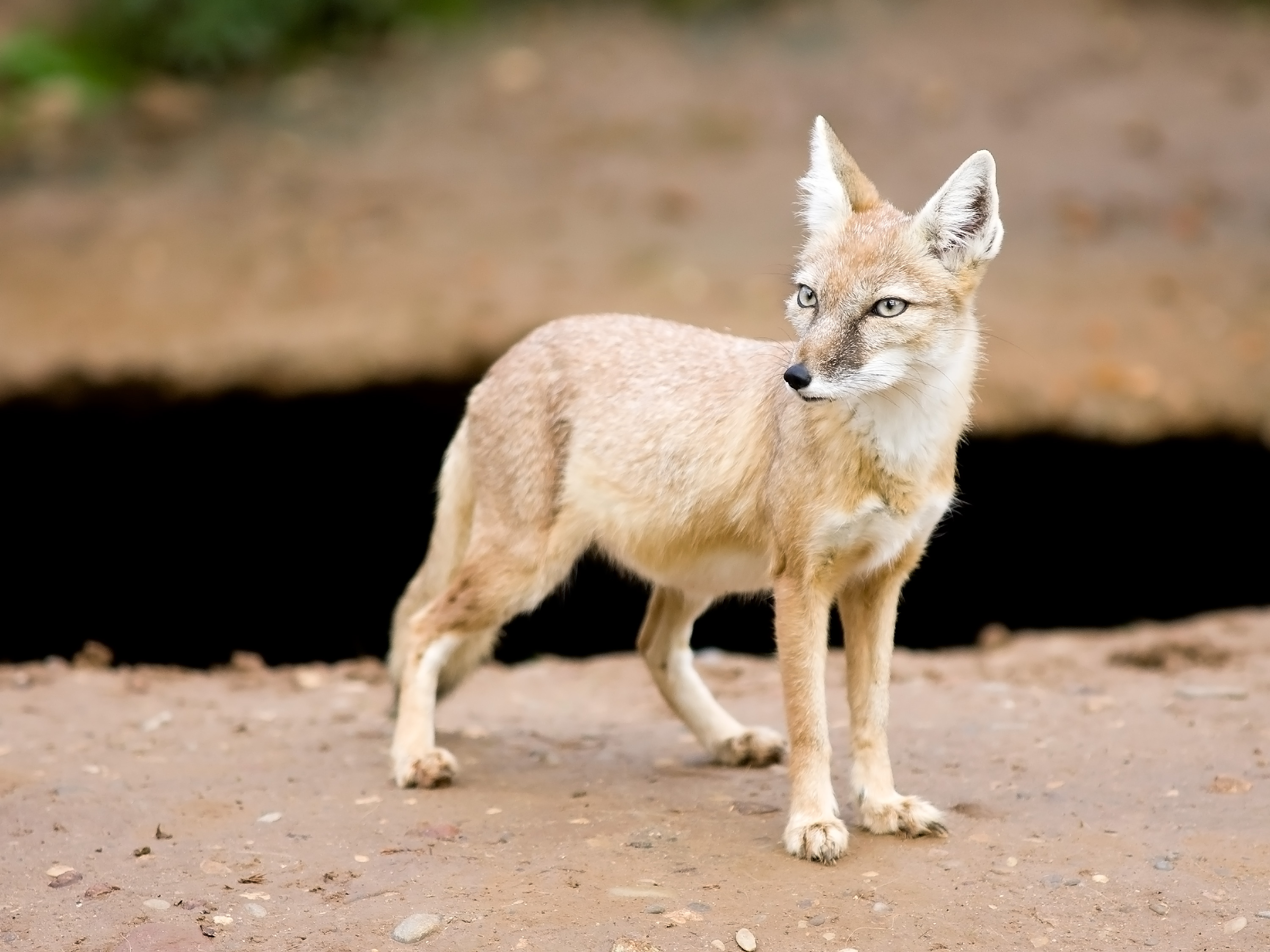
Corsac fox in its summer coat

As an adaption to the arid climate in which they live, corsac foxes can forego food and water for extended periods of time. The corsac fox is an opportunistic forager and hunter. Its diet varies throughout its range, but consists foremost of small and medium-sized vertebrates, insects and small rodents, such as voles, gerbils, jerboas, hamsters, and ground squirrels. It also feeds opportunistically on larger prey including hares and pikas. It scavenges for carrion and human refuse as well. Although predominantly carnivorous, it occasionally eats fruit and other vegetation, especially during winter when availability of animal prey is low. Natural predators of the corsac fox include gray wolf, Eurasian eagle-owl, eagles, and (rarely, for pups) the upland buzzard. Golden eagles are major predators, with 38% of remains found belonging to the corsac fox at a golden eagle nest in Mongolia.

The corsac fox is a nocturnal and nomadic hunter of the steppes. It does not have a defended territory, and unlike some foxes, sometimes forms packs. Diurnal activity is more common at times when kits need to be fed and when food is scarce, as during the winter. Because it cannot hunt in deep snow, it either shelters in dens during harsh weather, or, in the northern parts of its range, it migrates up to 600 km (370 mi) south in the winter. It has been reported to follow herds of local antelope, relying on them to compress the snow as they pass. It digs its own dens, which are generally shallow, but also takes over the burrows of other animals, such as marmots, ground squirrels, or badgers. Dens may have several entrances, but are usually less than 1 metre (3 ft 3 in) deep. The burrow is shared between the social packs, with several dens and connecting holes, which resemble "corsac cities". They are excellent climbers, but are rather slow runners and could be caught easily by a dog. While they are reported to be nocturnal in the wild, in captivity they are very active during the day.

== Reproduction ==
The mating season starts in January and ends in March. Males will initially fight for access to females, but eventually establish a monogamous bond, and assist in the raising of their young. The mother initially creates a birthing den, which is sometimes shared with other pregnant females, but moves her young to new burrows several times after they are born.

Typically, two to six young are born after a gestation period of 52 to 60 days, although cases of ten kits being born in a single litter have been reported. Newborn kits weigh around 60 g (2.1 oz), and have fluffy, light brown fur that turns yellowish as they age. They are born blind, and open their eyes at around two weeks of age; they begin to eat meat at four weeks, and emerge from the den shortly after. Corsac foxes reach sexual maturity within 9 to 10 months and reproduce in the second year of life. They live up to 9 years in the wild.

== Evolution ==
The corsac fox is one species within a holarctic clade of foxes that also includes the red fox, the swift fox and the Arctic fox, all of which it resembles. However, the closest related species to the corsac fox is probably the Tibetan sand fox. The immediate ancestor of the corsac fox is believed to be the extinct species Vulpes praecorsac, which lived in central Europe during the early Pleistocene. Fossils of corsac foxes date back to the mid-Pleistocene, and show the species once reached as far west as Switzerland, and as far south as Crimea.

Very recent subfossil remains dating to 3000 to 1000 B.C.E. have been found in the Crimea and 0 to 1500 B.C.E. in the Donets River Basin in the northern Black Sea region. Fossils of the corsac fox have been recovered from the famous Denisova Cave, known for being the type locality of the Denisova hominins.

== Taxonomy ==
Vulpes corsac corsac

Vulpes corsac kalmykorum

Vulpes corsac turkmenicus

The corsac fox is one of 12 extant Vulpes species and a member of the family Canidae. The cladogram below is based on the phylogeny of Lindblad-Toh (2005) modified to incorporate recent findings on Vulpes.

Corsac fox within Vulpes
- Vulpes
  - - Vulpes zerda (Fennec fox)
    - Vulpes cana (Blanford's fox)
  - - Vulpes chama (Cape fox)
    - - - - Vulpes vulpes (Red fox)
          - Vulpes rueppellii (Rüppell's fox)
        - - Vulpes corsac (Corsac fox)
          - Vulpes ferrilata (Tibetan fox)
      - - Vulpes macrotis (Kit fox)
        - Vulpes lagopus (Arctic fox)

Three subspecies are currently recognised:

- Vulpes corsac corsac - northern Kazakhstan, southern Siberia
- Vulpes corsac kalmykorum - northern Uzbekistan, Caucasus
- Vulpes corsac turkmenicus - southern Uzbekistan, Turkmenistan, China, Mongolia, and neighbouring regions

== Threats ==
The major threat posed to the corsac fox is poaching, as it is a valuable fur-bearing species and has been harvested by humans since the Bronze Age for subsistence and commercial purposes. It is a slow runner and therefore easily caught by hunters; the population has been reduced in areas where it has been heavily hunted for its fur. Traditionally, the corsac fox is often hunted with trained domestic dogs, saker falcons, and golden eagles, as well as caught with traps set at burrow entrances, leghold traps, and firearms. In the late 19th century, up to 10,000 foxes were killed annually for pelt trade. The general population remains healthy, however, as the corsac fox has proven to be able to withstand great hunting pressures, and their habitats remain intact due to the low human population density in its range.

Other threats include overgrazing by livestock and landscape development; the decline of marmots may also impact the species in some areas, as it often uses marmot burrows as daytime resting locations. The other main threat is natural disasters, which can cause the numbers of foxes to drop 90% in some areas, but the population often recovers quickly. As of 2014, the corsac fox is listed as least concern in the IUCN Red List.
