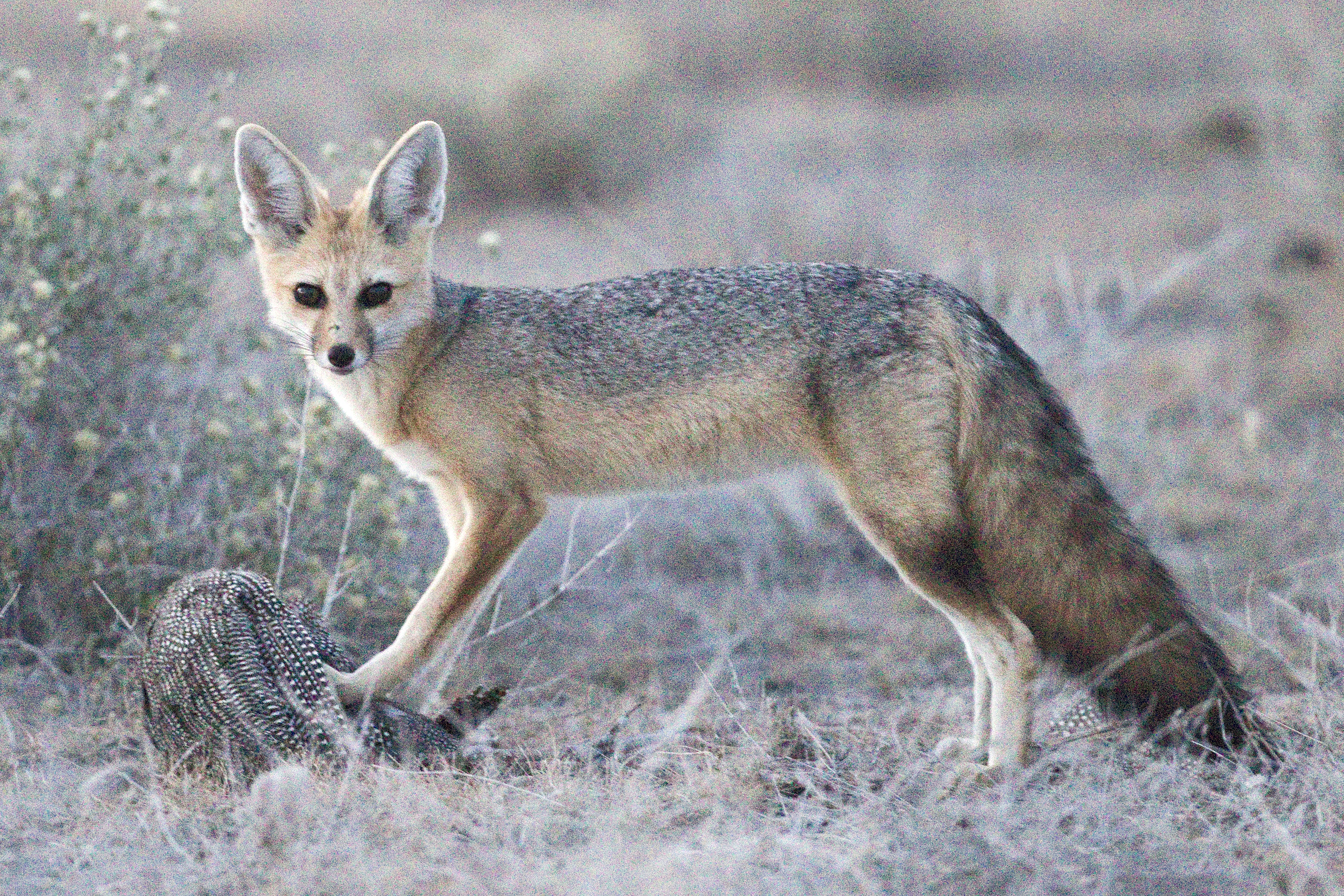
- Adult feeding on a helmeted guineafowl in Etosha National Park
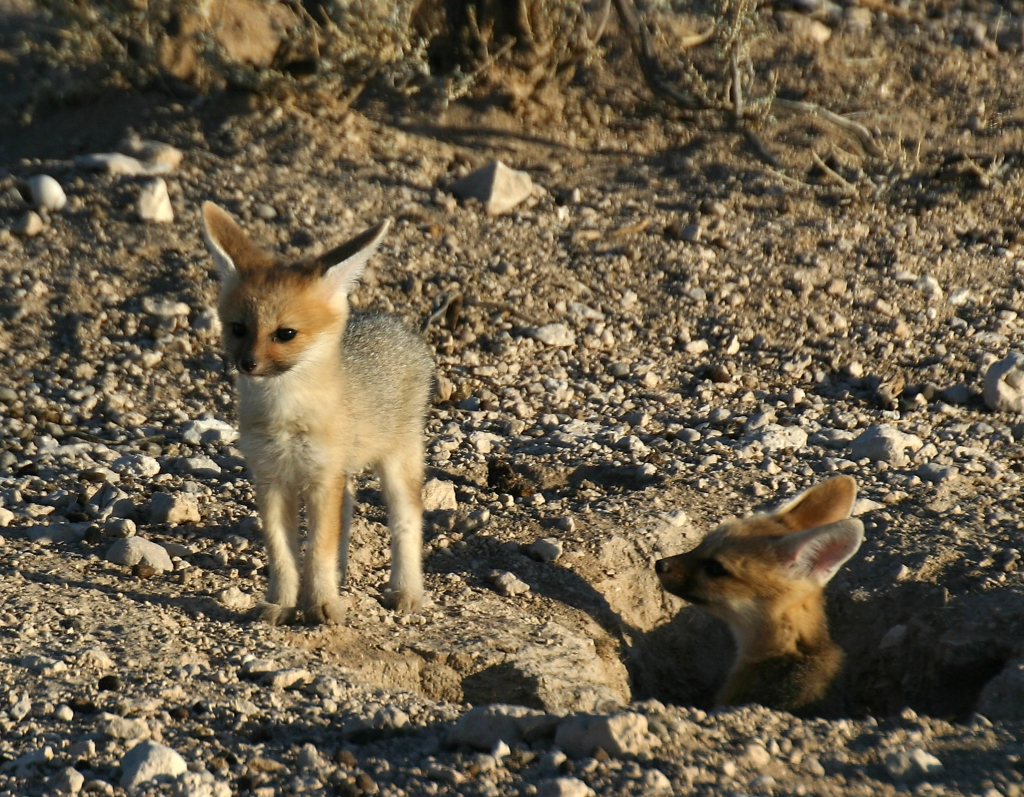
- Cape fox kits

Conservation status
- Least Concern (IUCN 3.1)

Scientific classification
- Kingdom: Animalia
- Phylum: Chordata
- Class: Mammalia
- Order: Carnivora
- Family: Canidae
- Genus: Vulpes
- Species: V. chama

Binomial name
- Vulpes chama (A Smith, 1833)
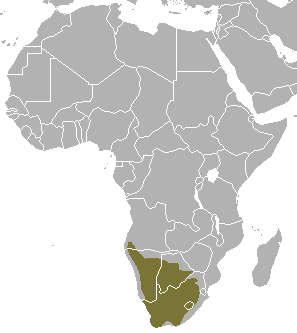
- Cape fox range

Synonyms
- caama (C. E. H. Smith, 1839); hodsoni (Noack, 1910); variegatoides (Layard, 1861)

= Cape fox =

Species of carnivore

The Cape fox (Vulpes chama), also called the asse, cama fox or the silver-backed fox, is a small species of fox, native to southern Africa. It is the only "true fox" occurring in sub-Saharan Africa, and it retains primitive characteristics of Vulpes because it diverged early in the evolutionary history of the group.

== Description ==
Vulpes chama is a small-built canid, usually measuring 45 to 62 cm (17.5 to 24.5 in) long, not including its tail, which is typically 30 to 40 cm (12 to 15.5 in). It is 30 to 35 cm (12 to 14 in) tall at the shoulder, and usually weighs from 2.5 to 4.5 kg (5.5 to 9.9 lb). The skull is very similar to that of V. bengalensis, although the cranium of V. chama is slightly wider and the maxillary region is slightly shorter.

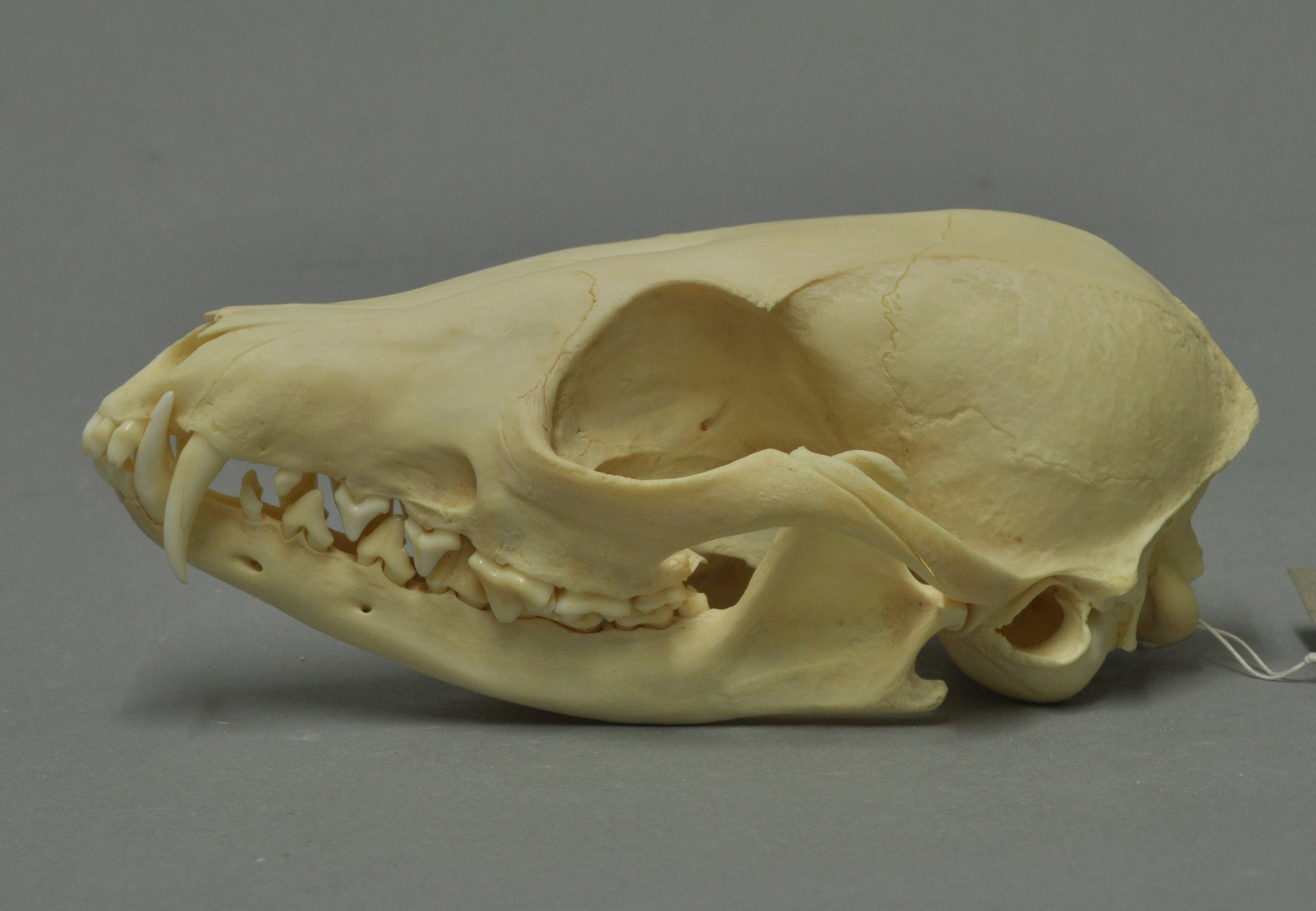
Skull of a cape fox

The ears are relatively large and sharp, the muzzle is small and pointed. Pelage colour is silvery-gray, tawny at the back of the ears, with white hairs appearing around the side of the pinna in the center. The colour of the neck and sides is lighter, and the underparts are pale tawny to pale buff. The head is dull red and the lower jaw is dark brown. There are white marks on the throat. The legs are more tawny than the rest of the body. The tail is dense and bushy, and can be silvery, pale fawn, buff with brown or black tips, or dull yellow. The tail tip is always black, and there's a dark spot over the caudal gland.

Pelage is soft and composed of a thick wavy underfur of around 25 mm (1 in) in length. Underfur is covered with a dense layer of guard hair < 40 mm (1.6 in) in thickness. Molt occurs in the wet season from October to November. V. chama presents little to no sexual dimorphism.

== Distribution and habitat ==
Cape fox is the only species in the genus Vulpes that exists in Africa south of the equator. It primarily occupies arid and semi-arid areas, but in sections, such as the fynbos biome of the western Cape Province of South Africa, the species reaches areas of higher rainfall and denser vegetation. In the central and western regions of southern Africa, the species is widespread, reaching around 15 ° N in south-western Angola. It is widespread in Zimbabwe, Botswana, and South Africa, occurring in most parts of the Western and Northern Cape provinces, the Eastern Cape (excluding the southeastern side), the Free State, western and northwestern KwaZulu-Natal and the North-West province. It also occurs in Lesotho, a high mountainous region.

== Behavior ==
The Cape fox is nocturnal and most active just before dawn or after dusk; it can be spotted during the early mornings and early evenings. During the day, it typically shelters in burrows underground, holes, hollows, or dense thickets. It is an active digger that will excavate its own burrow, although it generally modifies an abandoned burrow of another species, such as the springhare, to its specific requirements.

Cape foxes are mostly solitary, and although they form mated pairs, the males and females are often found foraging alone. Occasionally, however, they can gather in loose groups to feed. Although V. chama shows signs of territoriality, such as scent marking, home range overlap does occur.

Although a normally silent fox, the Cape fox is known to communicate with soft calls, whines or chirps. However, it will utter a loud bark when alarmed. A long-range vocalization of yelps or yapping barks has been described, but Cape foxes apparently do not howl. When in an aggressive mood, the Cape fox is known to growl and spit at its attacker. They may use other forms of communication, such as facial expressions and tail posturing; to show its excitement, the fox lifts its tail, the height of the tail often indicating the measure of excitement.

== Ecology ==
=== Diet ===
Cape foxes are completely omnivorous and opportunists, feeding mainly on small mammals (such as rodents) and insects, but also commonly eating birds, small reptiles, carrion and fruits. Other food items include: gerbils; field mice and other small rodents, hares, birds; bird nestlings and eggs, diverse vegetable material, including wild fruit, berries, seeds, roots, and tubers; lizards, insects, such as white ants, beetles and their larvae, and locusts. They may also consume larger mammals like steenbok (Raphicerus campestris) and other carnivores such as the yellow mongoose (Cynictis penicillata).

While Cape foxes have been reported to kill livestock, the predation level is unknown. Domestic sheep (Ovis aries) may comprise as much as 16.6% volume of its stomach content, but it appears to prey only on very young lambs (less than 3 months old), otherwise they can only consume it as carrion. They are known to cache food in holes.

=== Parasites and predators ===
The Cape fox can be hunted by lions (Panthera leo) and its young may be killed by the honey badger (Mellivora capensis). It is also sometimes preyed upon by black-backed jackals (Canis mesomelas) and other predators, such as African leopards (Panthera pardus), caracals (Caracal caracal), and birds of prey, such as hawks and owls.

It usually carries Echinococcus granulosus as an endoparasite and may be parasitised by fleas.

== Reproduction ==
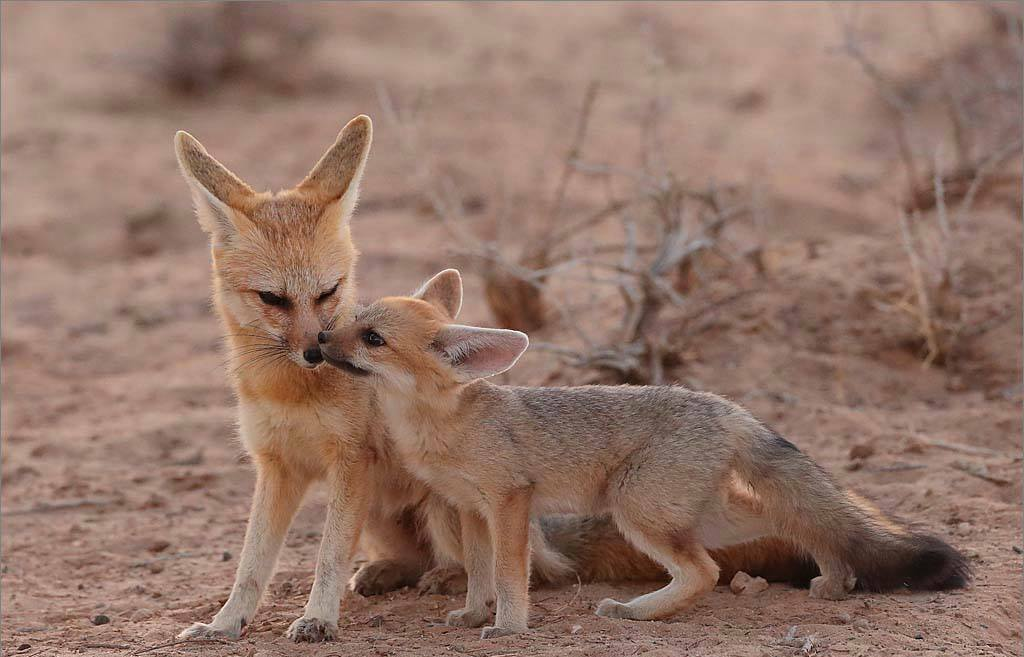
Cape foxes at the Kgalagadi Transfrontier Park

During the breeding season, in southern hemisphere winter the months of July and August, monogamous pairs may occur, but the duration and persistence from year to year is not well known. Paired adults typically only have contact during the mating season, but mouth sniffing or nuzzling ("greeting") occurs, as does body slamming.

The female Cape fox has a gestation period of 51 to 53 days and gives birth to a litter of one to six cubs (or kits). They typically weigh from 50 to 100 g (1.8 to 3.5 oz) at birth. Reared underground in burrows, the cubs stay close to the den until they are about four months old. Several females may also share simultaneously the same den. The cubs are weaned around six to eight weeks of age, but do not begin to forage until they are four months old and often play outside during daylight hours. Both parents care for the young, with the male also providing food to the female for at least 1–2 weeks postpartum. Cubs usually become independent at 5–11.5 months of age, when they disperse (typically in June or July). Juveniles may disperse 7–22 km (4.3–13.7 mi) from natal den and females may remain in their natal range. Some Cape fox subadults steal food brought to the kits at the den by the parents.

A family group usually consists of the parents and their offspring, but different family groups sometimes mix during feeding. Multiple litters are possible and have been observed; however, the female usually chases out the cubs from the last litter when she is expecting another one. Cape foxes are fully grown within about a year, with both the female and the male reaching sexual maturity at 9 months. The Cape fox has a life expectancy of about six years, but can live for up to 10 years.

== Taxonomy ==
Engraving of cape fox by John Gerrard Keulemans, 1890

Cape fox is one of 12 extant Vulpes species and a member of the family Canidae. The cladogram below is based on the phylogeny of Lindblad-Toh (2005) modified to incorporate recent findings on Vulpes.

Cape fox within Vulpes
- Vulpes
  - - Vulpes zerda (Fennec fox)
    - Vulpes cana (Blanford's fox)
  - - Vulpes chama (Cape fox)
    - - - - Vulpes vulpes (Red fox)
          - Vulpes rueppellii (Rüppell's fox)
        - - Vulpes corsac (Corsac fox)
          - Vulpes ferrilata (Tibetan fox)
      - - Vulpes macrotis (Kit fox)
        - Vulpes lagopus (Arctic fox)

== Conservation ==
Habitat loss does not appear to be a major factor influencing the conservation status of the Cape fox; in some regions, changing agricultural practices have resulted in range extensions for this species. As these foxes are presumed to prey on livestock, in particular lambs, they are commonly target by farmers. They are targeted by various control methods, such as leg-hold traps and the illegal but widespread use of agricultural poisons on commercial farms. These control measures do not seem to have had a major impact on populations of the Cape fox, even though they have resulted in declines in some areas. They also often succumb to diseases such as rabies and canine distemper, and a large number of Cape foxes are killed on the road by vehicles. Many are hunted and persecuted as vermin. About 2,500 individuals are killed yearly; which is approximately 16% of the population. Nonetheless, populations of V. chama are currently stable across their entire geographic range thus it is not listed in the IUCN Red List.
