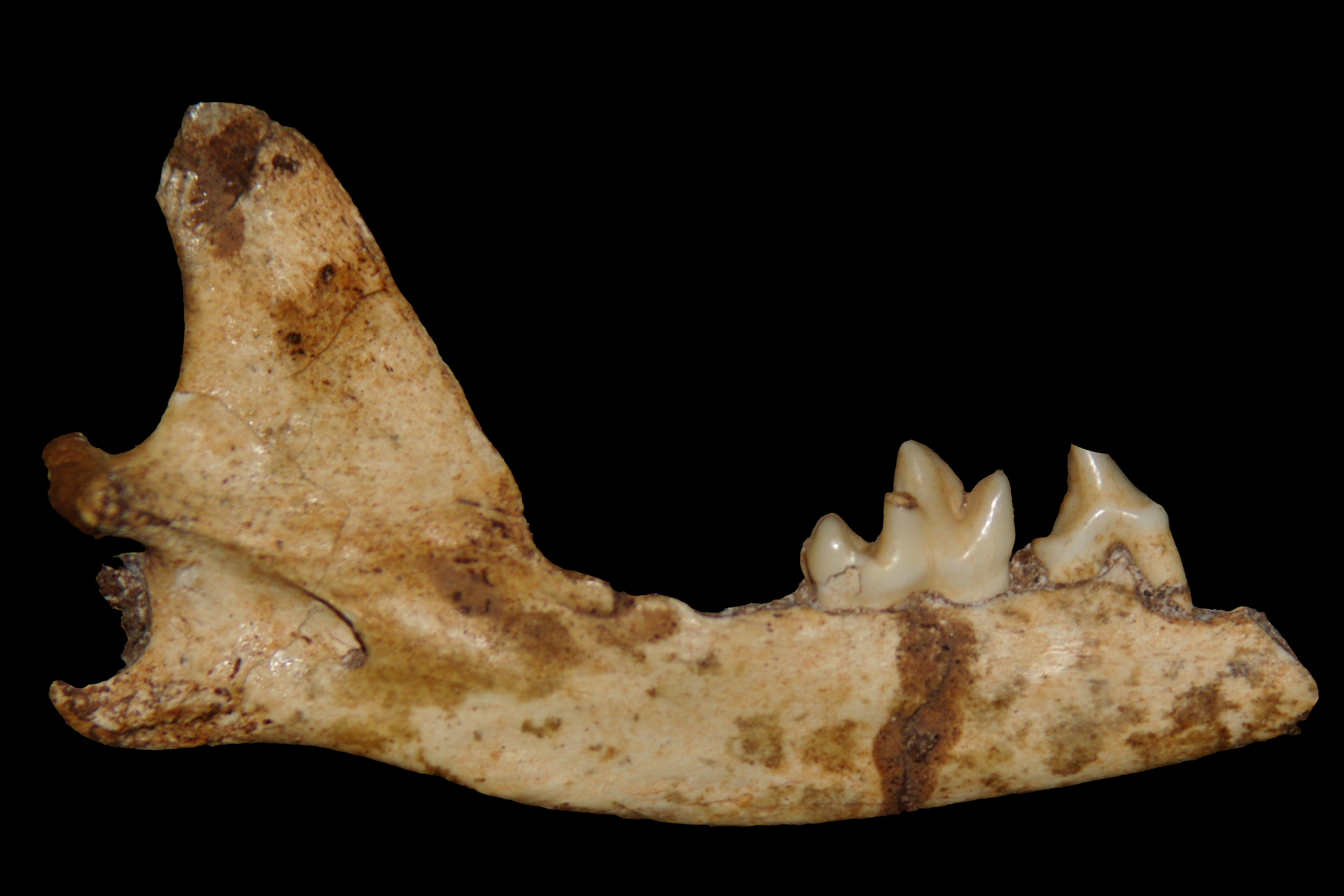
- Mandible of type specimen

Scientific classification
- Kingdom: Animalia
- Phylum: Chordata
- Class: Mammalia
- Order: Carnivora
- Family: Canidae
- Genus: Vulpes
- Species: †V. skinneri

Binomial name
- †Vulpes skinneri Adam Hartstone-Rose et al., 2013

= Vulpes skinneri =

Vulpes skinneri Temporal range: 1.977–1.98 Ma Pleistocene

Extinct species of fox of the early Pleistocene

Vulpes skinneri is a species of extinct fox in the genus Vulpes from the early Pleistocene, identified based on fossil remains dated to about 2 million years ago. The species is known from a single partial skeleton discovered in the Malapa Fossil Site at the Cradle of Humankind World Heritage Site in South Africa and is associated with the fossil hominin remains of Australopithecus sediba. The fossils have been dated to between 1.977 and 1.980 million years ago. Hartstone-Rose and colleagues described the remains as a newly discovered species of fox, which they named skinneri after the African mammalogist John Skinner.

== Discovery ==
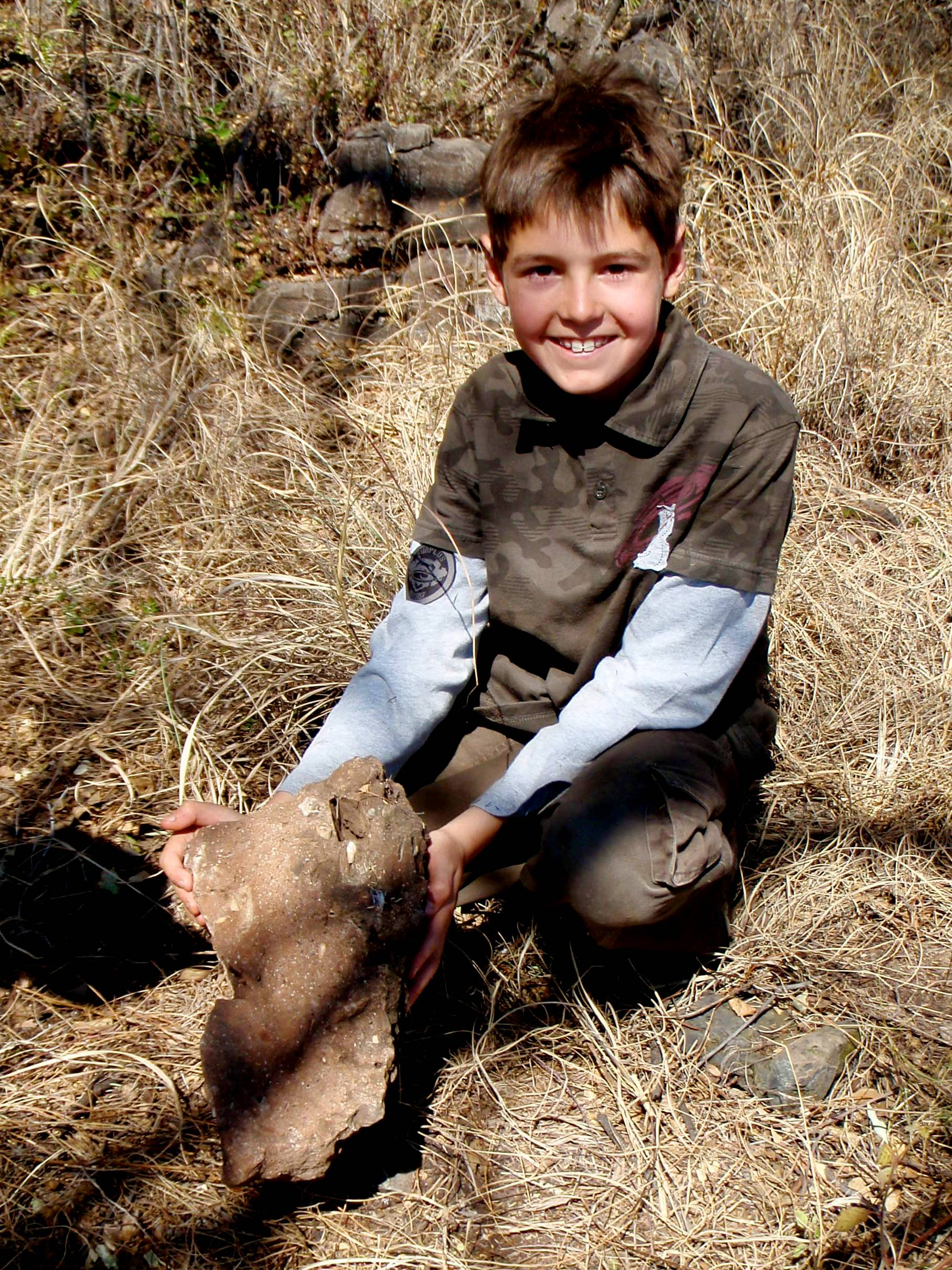
Matthew Berger displays the fossil he found on the Malapa Nature Reserve

The type specimen of V. skinneri was discovered during preparation of fossil bearing blocks from Malapa. The find was announced to the public on January 16, 2013. Also found at the Malapa archeological site were a variety of animal fossils, including saber-toothed cats, mongooses, and antelopes. Berger and geologist Paul Dirks speculated that the animals might have fallen into a deep, 100–150-foot (30–46 m) "death-trap", perhaps lured by the scent of water. The bodies may have then been swept into a pool of water rich with lime, and with sand at the bottom, making it possible for the remains to become fossilized.

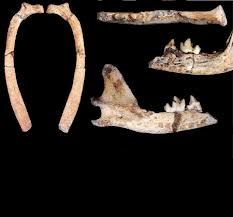
The partial skeleton of the type specimen of Vulpes skinneri

== Age estimates ==
The fossil was dated using a combination of palaeomagnetism and uranium-lead (U-Pb) dating which showed that the fossils are not older than ~2.0 Ma. The occurrence of species of animal that became extinct at ~1.5 Ma indicate the deposit is not younger than 1.5 Ma. The sediments have a 'normal' magnetic polarity and the only major period between 2.0 and 1.5 Ma when this occurred is the Olduvai sub-Chron between 1.95 and 1.78 Ma. As such, the fossils were originally dated to ~1.95 Ma. Recent dating of a capping flowstone illustrated this was not possible and the normal magnetic polarity sediments have since been correlated to the 3000-year-long Pre-Olduvai event at ~1.977 Ma.

== Morphology and interpretations ==
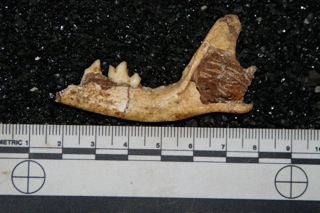
A scaled picture of the mandible of Vulpes skinneri

Three associated small canid specimens (an M2, a rib and a posterior mandibular fragment including the P4, M1, coronoid, condylar and angular processes) that were originally attributed to Vulpes cf. V. chama are reassigned to V. skinneri. In the paper describing the new specimens, the authors argue that "we compare these specimens to a broad sample of modern and fossil foxes and conclude that these specimens are distinct enough to be referred to a new species" of the early Pleistocene, identified based on fossil remains dated to about 2 million years ago.
