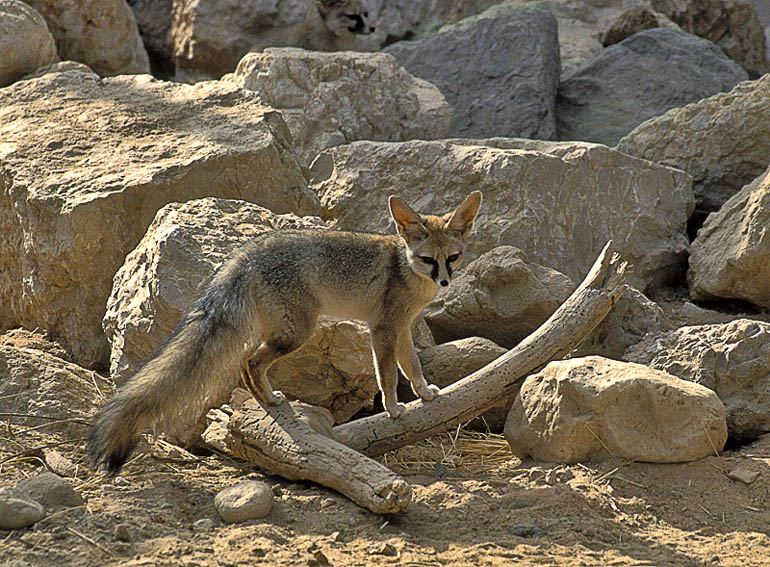

Conservation status
- Least Concern (IUCN 3.1)
- CITES Appendix II

Scientific classification
- Kingdom: Animalia
- Phylum: Chordata
- Class: Mammalia
- Order: Carnivora
- Family: Canidae
- Genus: Vulpes
- Species: V. cana

Binomial name
- Vulpes cana (Blanford, 1877)
- Range of Blanford's fox

Synonyms
- Vulpes nigricans (Shitkow, 1907); Canis cana; Canis nigricans; Fennecus cana; Fennecus nigricans

= Blanford's fox =

Species of carnivore

Blanford's fox (Vulpes cana) is a small fox native to West Asia, Central Asia and parts of South Asia. It is listed as Least Concern on the IUCN Red List.

== Description ==
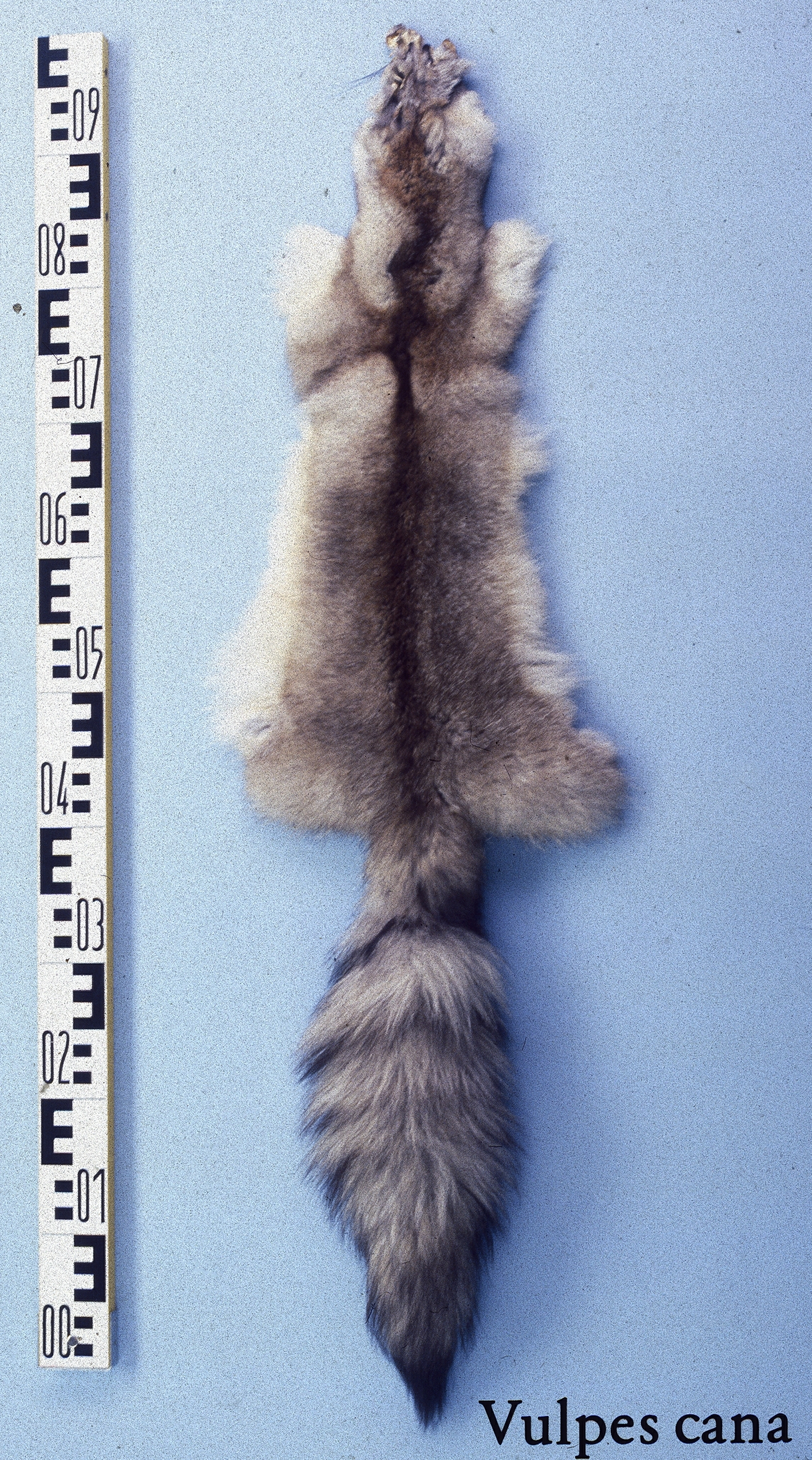
Fur of Blanford's fox

Blanford's fox is a small fox with wide ears and a long, bushy tail nearly equal to the length of its body. Its body size often varies geographically. In the Afghan-Iranian region, the collected specimens had head-body lengths of 38.5–80 cm (15.2–31.5 in) and tail lengths of 33–41 cm (13–16 in), while specimens in Oman had a total length of 73.5–76 cm (28.9–29.9 in) and a tail length of 35–36 cm (14–14 in). Weights of those specimens averaged 873 g (30.8 oz), body lengths 42 cm (17 in), tail 32.5 cm (12.8 in). Among all extant canids, only the fennec fox is smaller than Blanford's.

The body is brownish-grey, fading to light yellow on the belly. The winter coat is soft and woolly, with a dense black undercoat and white fur speckles in the dorsal area; together with a somewhat thicker layer of fat, it serves as thermal insulation in cold and dry winter. The summer coat is less thick, the fur is paler, and the white hair is less noticeable. A characteristic mid-dorsal black band extends caudally from the nape of the spine, becoming a mid-dorsal crest along the length of the tail. The tail is the same colour as the body. A black spot is found at the base of the spine. The tip of the tail is normally black, but it is white in some individuals. The dark mid-dorsal line, which is a distinctive characteristic of the Israeli specimens, is less noticeable in Oman specimens, although the black tail markings are similarly developed.

Like other arid land foxes, the Blanford's fox characteristically large ear is an adaptation to enhance heat dissipation. However, unlike other desert foxes, it does not have pads covered with hair.

The Blanford's fox has an ability to climb rocks and make jumps described as "astonishing", jumping to ledges 3 m (9.8 ft) above them with ease, and as part of their regular movements and climbing vertical, crumbling cliffs by a series of jumps up vertical sections. The foxes use their sharp, curved claws and naked footpads for traction on narrow ledges and their long, bushy tails as a counterbalance.

== Distribution and habitat ==
The Blanford's fox has a rather discontinuous range. Initially known only in southwest Asia, this species was reported in Israel in 1981 and was later found to be more widespread in the Arabian Peninsula. Confirmed records exist in the Sinai Peninsula, Jordan, Saudi Arabia, Oman and the United Arab Emirates. It has long been suspected of occurring in Yemen and has been reported at an elevation of about 1,200 m (3,900 ft) in Hawf Forest, Al Mahra Governorate, in the far east of Yemen, near the border with Oman. It also seemed possible that it may have lived in western Yemen, where the mountains in southwestern Arabia were contiguous, and the camera trapping record in February 2014 in Wadi Sharis in Hajjah Governorate, NW of Sana'a, now confirms its presence. There is a single record in Egypt west of the Suez Canal, of an animal captured in 1988, originally thought to be a Rüppel's fox. Available distribution records indicate that it occurs around the Iranian Plateau, Turkmenistan and Pakistan; skins were also collected in Afghanistan and Tajikistan.

It was also sighted in northern Saudi Arabia and in the Western Hajar Mountains of Ras Al Khaimah. In 2019, it was spotted in Jebel Hafeet, United Arab Emirates.

== Behaviour and ecology ==
The Blanford's fox is strictly nocturnal, an activity pattern that is most definitely an anti-predator response to diurnal raptors. There are no significant seasonal or gender variations in the activity patterns, and climate conditions at night in the desert of Israel seemed to have little direct effect on their activity, except under extreme conditions.

=== Diet ===
Blanford's fox is omnivorous and primarily insectivorous and frugivorous. In Israel, plant food consists mainly of the fruit of two caperbush species, Capparis cartilaginea and Capparis spinosa; they also consume fruits and plant material of date palm (Phoenix dactylifera), Ochradenus baccatus, Fagonia mollis, and various species of Gramineae. Blanford's foxes in Pakistan are largely frugivorous, feeding on Russian olives (Elaeagnus hortensis), melons, and grapes.

Blanford's foxes are almost always solitary foragers, only foraging in pairs on occasion. Unlike other fox species, it seldom caches food.

=== Reproduction ===
Blanford's foxes are thought to be strictly monogamous. Monogamy may be beneficial in this species as the dispersion of their prey is such that, in order to accommodate additional adults, it would demand a territorial expansion that would bring more costs than benefits.

Females are monoestrous and come into heat during January–February. Gestation period is around 50–60 days, and litter size is one to three. The lactation period is 30–45 days. Neonates are born with soft, black fur, with an estimated body mass of 29 g. At the age of two months, the kits start to forage with one of the parents, and at 3 months of age they begin to forage on their own. Juveniles have similar markings as adults, but their fur is darker and more grayish. Sexual maturity is reached at the age of 10–12 months.

Average lifespan of Blanford's foxes is 4 to 5 years, and does not exceed 10 years in the wild.

== Taxonomy ==
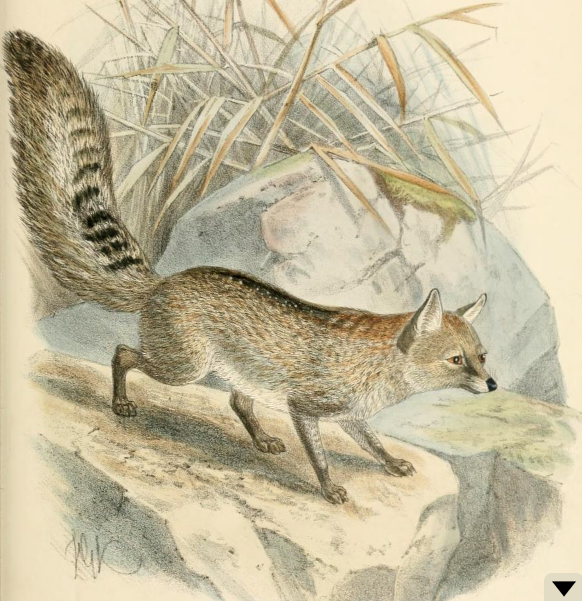
Engraving of Blanford's fox by John Gerrard Keulemans, 1890

Blanford's fox was scientifically described under the name Vulpes cana by William Thomas Blanford in 1877 based on a zoological specimen from southern Balochistan. Blanford's fox is one of 12 extant Vulpes species and a member of the family Canidae. The cladogram below is based on the phylogeny of Lindblad-Toh (2005) modified to incorporate recent findings on Vulpes.

Blanford's fox within Vulpes
- Vulpes
  - - Vulpes zerda (Fennec fox)
    - Vulpes cana (Blanford's fox)
  - - Vulpes chama (Cape fox)
    - - - - Vulpes vulpes (Red fox)
          - Vulpes rueppellii (Rüppell's fox)
        - - Vulpes corsac (Corsac fox)
          - Vulpes ferrilata (Tibetan fox)
      - - Vulpes macrotis (Kit fox)
        - Vulpes lagopus (Arctic fox)

== Conservation ==
While the IUCN has downgraded Blanford's fox to "least concern" as more has been learned about the breadth of its distribution across the Middle East, very little is known about this species and its vulnerabilities to the diseases of domesticated dogs that have so badly affected other canids. Currently, little competition exists with humans for habitat, and the fox is a protected species in Israel and protected from hunting in Oman and Yemen. Some fur hunting occurs in Afghanistan, and occasionally they may take poison intended for hyenas and other species.

== See also ==
- Wildlife of Afghanistan
- Wildlife of Egypt
- Wildlife of Iran
- Wildlife of Israel
- Wildlife of Jordan
- Wildlife of Oman
- Wildlife of Pakistan
- Wildlife of Saudi Arabia
- Wildlife of the United Arab Emirates
- Wildlife of Yemen
