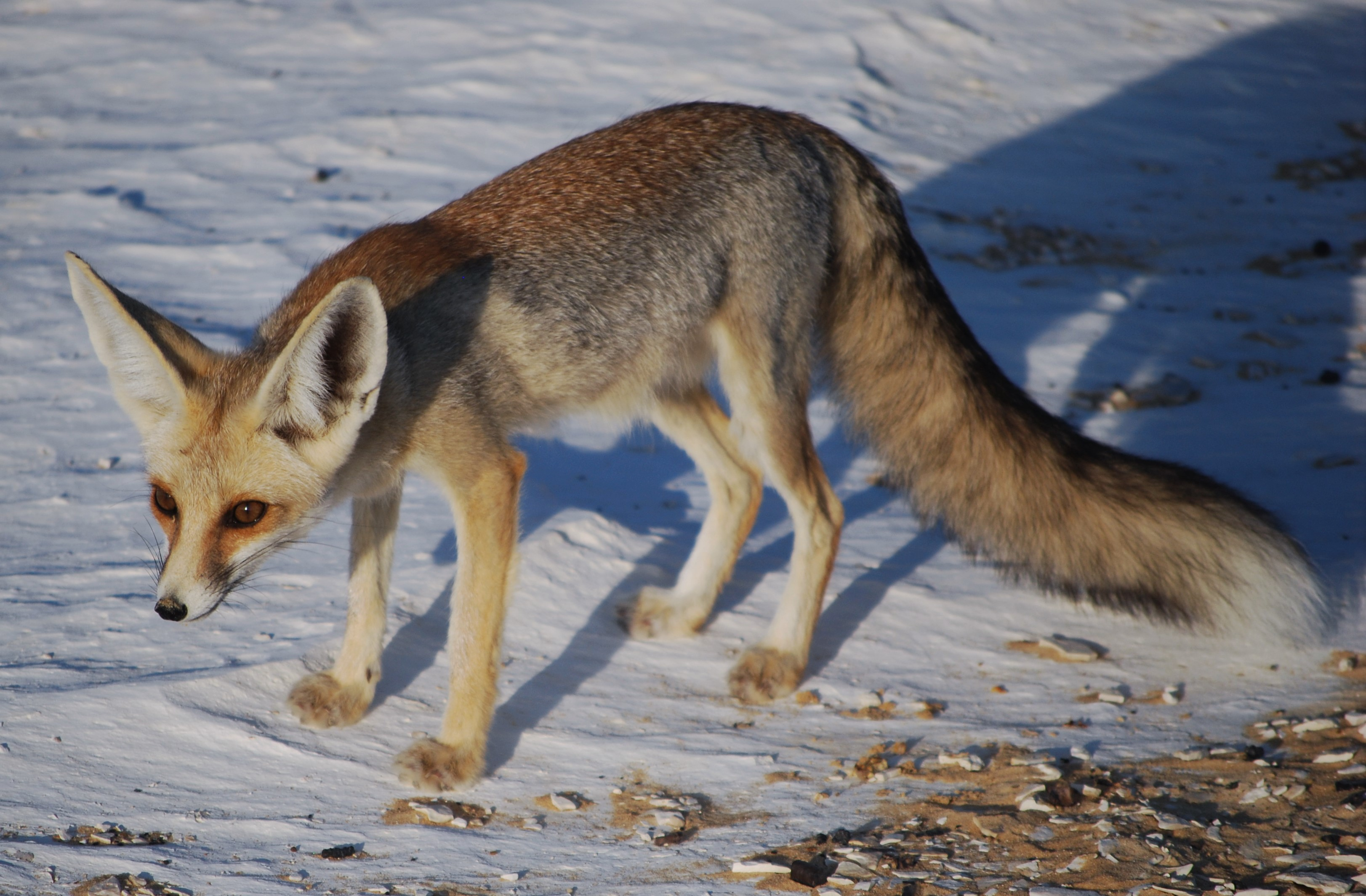

Conservation status
- Least Concern (IUCN 3.1)

Scientific classification
- Kingdom: Animalia
- Phylum: Chordata
- Class: Mammalia
- Order: Carnivora
- Family: Canidae
- Genus: Vulpes
- Species: V. rueppellii

Binomial name
- Vulpes rueppellii (Schinz, 1825)
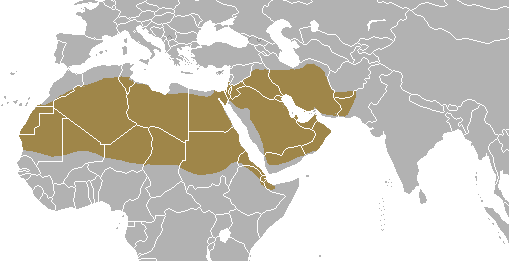
- Rüppell's fox range

Synonyms
- Canis rueppellii; Fennecus rueppellii; Vulpes famelica

= Rüppell's fox =

Species of carnivore

Rüppell's fox (Vulpes rueppellii), also called Rüppell's sand fox, is a fox species living in desert and semi-desert regions of North Africa, the Middle East, and southwestern Asia. It has been listed as Least Concern on the IUCN Red List since 2008. It is named after the German naturalist Eduard Rüppell.

== Description ==
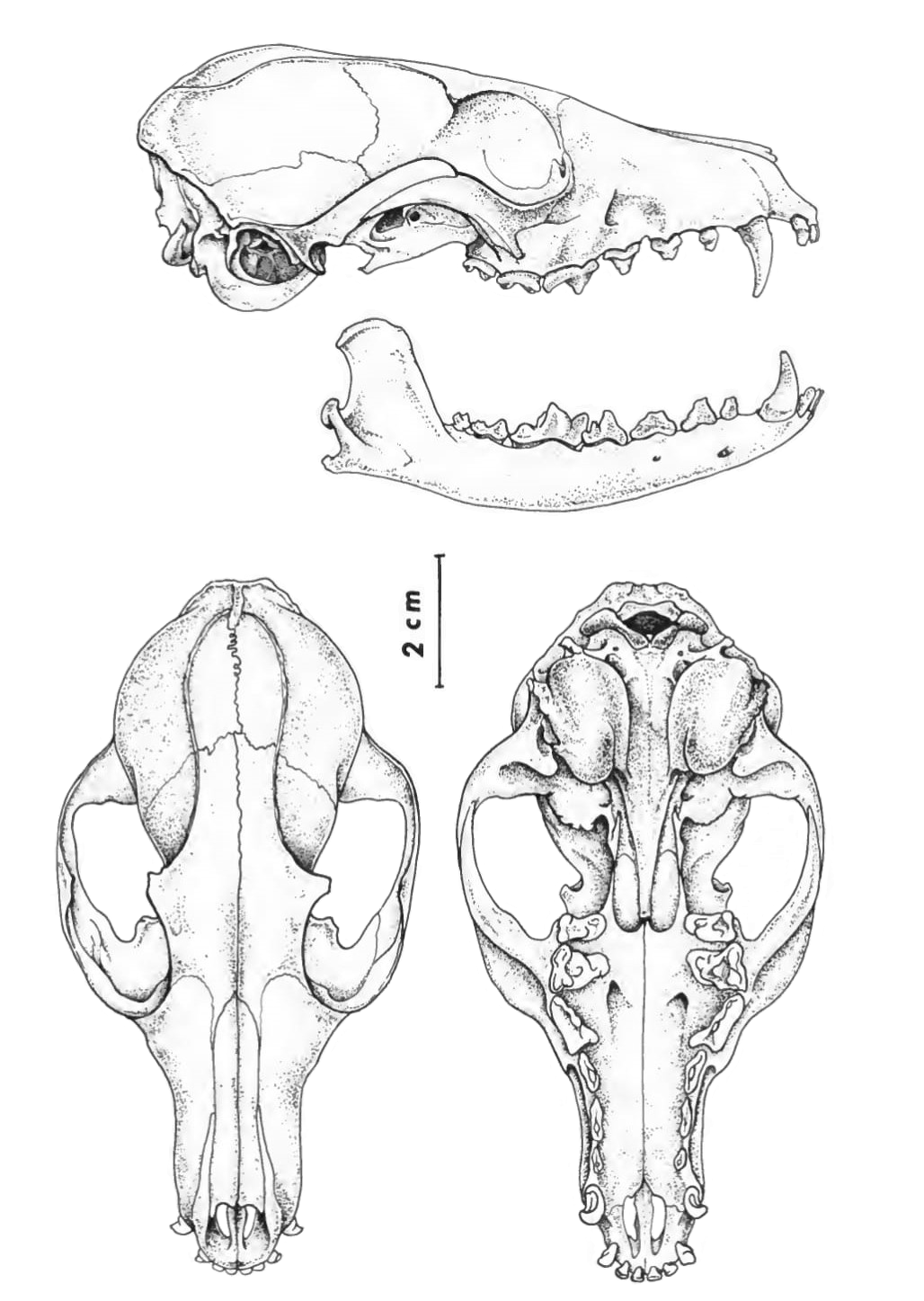
Skull

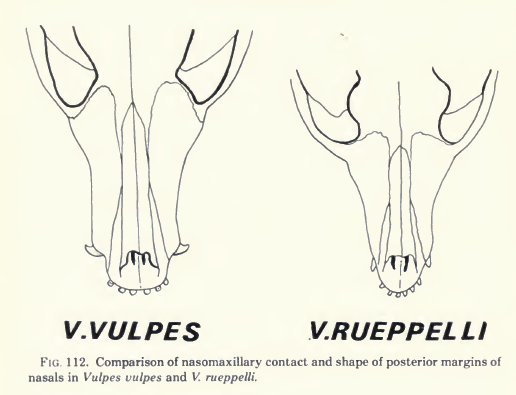
Comparison between the skulls of a red fox (left) and a Rüppell's fox (right)

Rüppell's fox is a small fox, measuring 66 to 74 cm (26 to 29 in) in total length, including a tail measuring 27–30 cm (11–12 in) long. There is no pronounced sexual dimorphism, but males appear slightly larger than females. Both sexes are reported to have an average weight of 1.7 kg (3.7 lb). Their coat is sandy with some brown, ticked with numerous white hairs, and fading from reddish along the middle of the back to pure white on the animal's underparts and on the tip of its tail. The flanks are also paler. The head has a more rusty tone on the muzzle and forehead, with dark brown patches on the sides of the muzzle, stretching up towards the eyes. The chin and the sides of the face are white. The whiskers are long, reaching 7 cm (2.8 in).

Its relatively small legs are beige in color, with individual black hairs that turn lighter to white towards the legs. The soles are heavily coated with fur that fully covers the pads, an adaptation to extremes of temperature in the desert, that probably helps to distribute its weight and move easily on sand. The back has a black speckling, resulting in a thick black patch at the base of the tail, which is bushy with a white tip. The fur is very soft and fluffy in two coats, a heavier denser winter coat and a thinner summer coat. The females have three pairs of mammae.

Similar to other desert-dwelling foxes, Rüppell's fox has large ears to cool it off. Although adults are too large to confuse with fennec foxes, which live in the same area, young Rüppell's foxes can be confused with adults of that species. The larger ears, however, make them easy to distinguish from red and pale foxes, which also live in some of the same areas. In addition, the coat of a Rüppell's fox is much paler than that of a red fox, while pale foxes lack the white tips on their tails.

Rüppell's fox has 2n = 40 chromosomes.

== Distribution and habitat ==
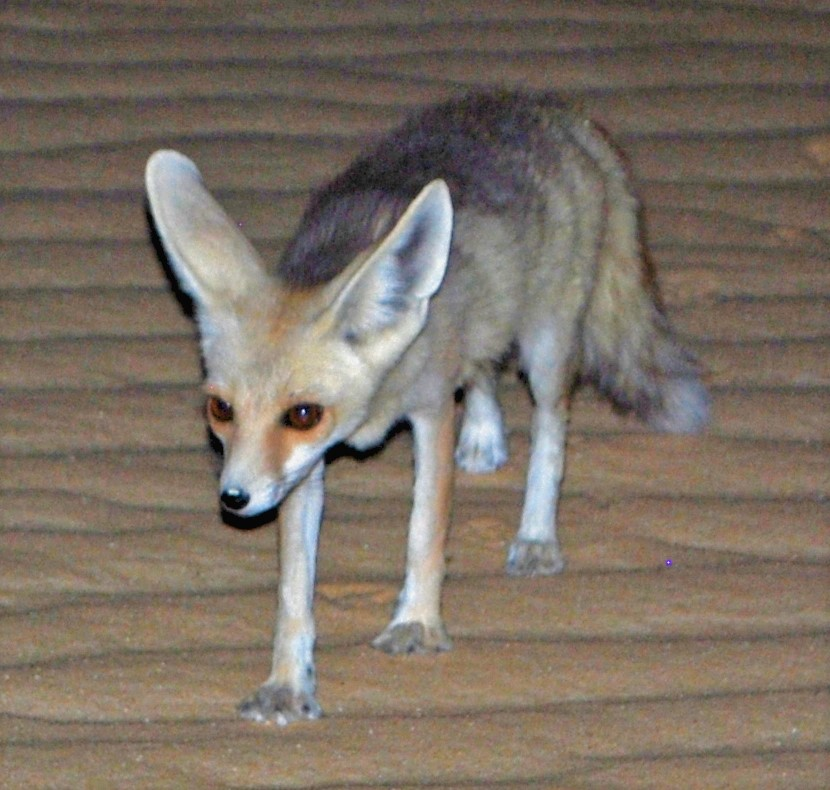
Rüppell's fox in White Desert National Park

Rüppell's fox is found in the deserts of North Africa south of the Atlas Mountains, from Mauritania and Morocco in the west to Egypt and Djibouti in the east. The species is also found in Algeria, central Niger, Libya, northern Chad, Egypt, southern Sudan, the arid lowlands of Ethiopia and northern Somalia. It is common in Arabia, except along the coast of the Red Sea and in the mountainous outskirts. It also occurs in the Arabian Peninsula from Syria, the Palestine region, Jordan and Iraq to Iran, Afghanistan and Pakistan. Within this region, it prefers sandy or rocky deserts, but lives also in semiarid steppes and sparse scrub.

It is assumed that the distribution areas have changed historically with desertification and are mainly limited by competition with the red fox (Vulpes vulpes) and by human settlements. In 2007, an expansion of the occurrence of foxes in the United Arab Emirates was documented through the first sighting of the species in Al Dhafra in the Emirate of Abu Dhabi. It seems to avoid the extreme arid regions in the middle of the Sahara, being more abundant on the fringes, in mountain massifs and near oases. Annual rainfall in the region of distribution of the species is normally between 100 and a maximum of 240 mm per year, mostly on the northern edge of the Sahara with a maximum of 150 mm per year.

In Tunisia, the Rüppell's fox occurs in the Saharan habitat in Jebil National Park and possibly farther to the south-west.

== Behavior and ecology ==
Rüppell's fox on a roof

Rüppell's foxes are monogamous and either crepuscular or nocturnal. They usually spend the day resting in their underground dens, but in winter they are occasionally active during the day. In Tunisia's Jebil National Park, recent research has shown a prodominently nocturnal activity pattern with very rare crepuscular observations preceding sunrise.

They use two different types of burrows, which are strictly separated: the breeding dens and the resting dens. The resting dens (used outside of the breeding season) are small dens that can hold only one adult fox, and the fox changes dens frequently, on average about every 4.7 days. Breeding dens are larger, and occupied by a pair of adults and their kits. Such dens can sometimes have more than one entrance, although this is unusual. They make a series of short barks during mating and, at other times, can also produce hisses, trills, and sharp whistles. They have been reported to wag their tails, like domestic dogs.

Rüppell's foxes occupy distinct territories, which they mark with urine, but not with dung as red foxes do. The territories of the members of a mated pair overlap almost completely, but are entirely separate from those of any neighboring pairs. These territories are maintained throughout the year, although the pair occupy separate dens outside of the mating season. The size of the territories varies with the local terrain, but has been reported as around 70 km^{2} (27 sq mi) in Oman, with those of males being larger, on average, than those of females. The foxes range widely during their nocturnal foraging, travelling over 9 km (5.6 mi) in a night.

Its only natural predators are the steppe eagle and the eagle-owl.

=== Diet ===
Rüppell's foxes are omnivores, with a diet that varies considerably depending on what is locally available. In some regions, they are reported to be mainly insectivorous, especially feeding on beetles and orthopterans, while in others, small mammals, lizards, and birds form a larger part of their diet. Plants eaten include grasses and desert succulents, along with fruits such as dates, and they have also been known to scavenge from human garbage.

=== Reproduction ===
Mating occurs in November, a few weeks after the female has prepared her breeding den. Litters up to six kits, although more usually just two or three, are born after a gestation period around 52–53 days. The young are born blind. They reach independence at about four months, when they may travel up to 48 km (30 mi) in search of a suitable territory. They can live an average of seven years in the wild, but have been reported to live up to 12 years in captivity.

== Taxonomy ==
The sister species of Rüppell's fox is the red fox (Vulpes vulpes). For mitochondrial DNA, Rüppell's fox is nested inside the genetic lineages of the red fox, called paraphyly. This may have been caused by a recent divergence of Rüppell's fox from the red fox lineage, or by incomplete lineage sorting, or introgression of mitochondrial DNA between the two species. Based on fossil record evidence, the last scenario seems most likely, which is further supported by the clear ecological and morphological differences between the two species.

Illustration of Rüppell's fox as Vulpes famelica by Pierre Jacques Smit, 1898

Rüppell's fox is one of 12 extant Vulpes species and a member of the family Canidae. The cladogram below is based on the phylogeny of Lindblad-Toh (2005) modified to incorporate recent findings on Vulpes.

Rüppell's fox within Vulpes
- Vulpes
  - - Vulpes zerda (Fennec fox)
    - Vulpes cana (Blanford's fox)
  - - Vulpes chama (Cape fox)
    - - - - Vulpes vulpes (Red fox)
          - Vulpes rueppellii (Rüppell's fox)
        - - Vulpes corsac (Corsac fox)
          - Vulpes ferrilata (Tibetan fox)
      - - Vulpes macrotis (Kit fox)
        - Vulpes lagopus (Arctic fox)

Although some authors consider Rüppell's fox to be monotypic, others list up to five subspecies:

- Vulpes rueppellii caesia
- Vulpes rueppellii cyrenaica
- Vulpes rueppellii rueppelli
- Vulpes rueppellii sabaea
- Vulpes rueppellii zarudneyi

== Philately ==
The Libyan General Posts and Telecommunications Company (GPTC), in cooperation with the World Wide Fund for Nature, dedicated a postal stamp issue to Rüppell's fox on May 1, 2008. The issue is made of a set of four stamps printed in minisheets of two sets. The issue was completed with a special first day of issue cover having a special postmark.
