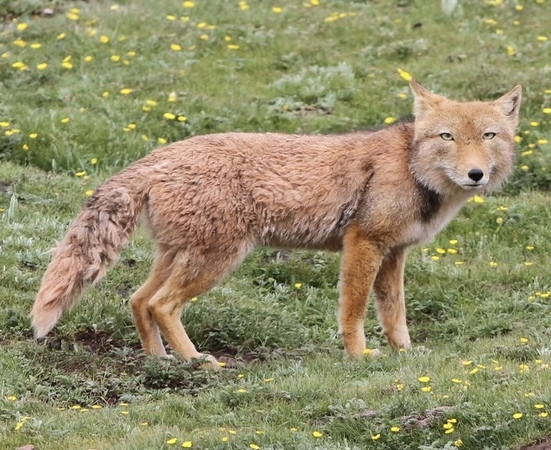

Conservation status
- Least Concern (IUCN 3.1)

Scientific classification
- Kingdom: Animalia
- Phylum: Chordata
- Class: Mammalia
- Order: Carnivora
- Family: Canidae
- Genus: Vulpes
- Species: V. ferrilata

Binomial name
- Vulpes ferrilata Hodgson, 1842
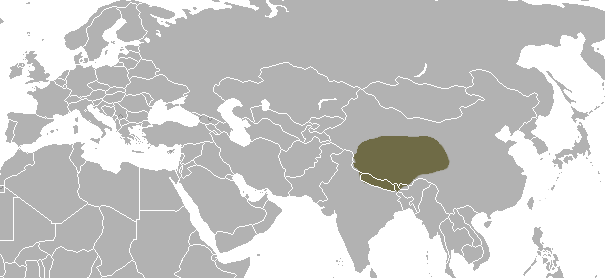
- Tibetan fox range

Synonyms
- Vulpes ferrilatus; Vulpes ekloni (Przewalski, 1883); Canis ferrilatus; Canis ekloni; Neocyon ferrilatus; Neocyon ekloni

= Tibetan fox =

Species of true fox

The Tibetan fox (Vulpes ferrilata), also known as the Tibetan sand fox, is a species of true fox endemic to the high Tibetan Plateau and Bhutan, China, India and Nepal up to elevations of about 5,300 m (17,400 ft). It is listed as Least Concern in the IUCN Red List, on account of its widespread range in the Tibetan Plateau's steppes and semi-deserts.

== Characteristics ==
The Tibetan fox has a soft and dense rufous coloured coat from the crown, neck, back to the lower legs. Its muzzle is narrow, its cheeks, flanks, upper legs and rumps are grey, and its bushy tail has white tips. The short ears are tan to greyish tan on the back, while the insides and undersides are white. Adult Tibetan foxes are 60 to 70 cm (24 to 28 in), not including tail, and have tail lengths of 29 to 40 cm (11 to 16 in). Weights of adults are usually 4 to 5.5 kg (8.8 to 12.1 lb).

Among the true foxes, its skull is the most specialised in the direction of carnivory; it is longer in the condylobasal length, and in mandible and cheek tooth length, than those of hill foxes. Its cranial region is shorter than that of hill foxes, and the zygomatic arches narrower. Its jaws are also much narrower, and the forehead concave. Its canine teeth are also much longer than those of hill foxes.

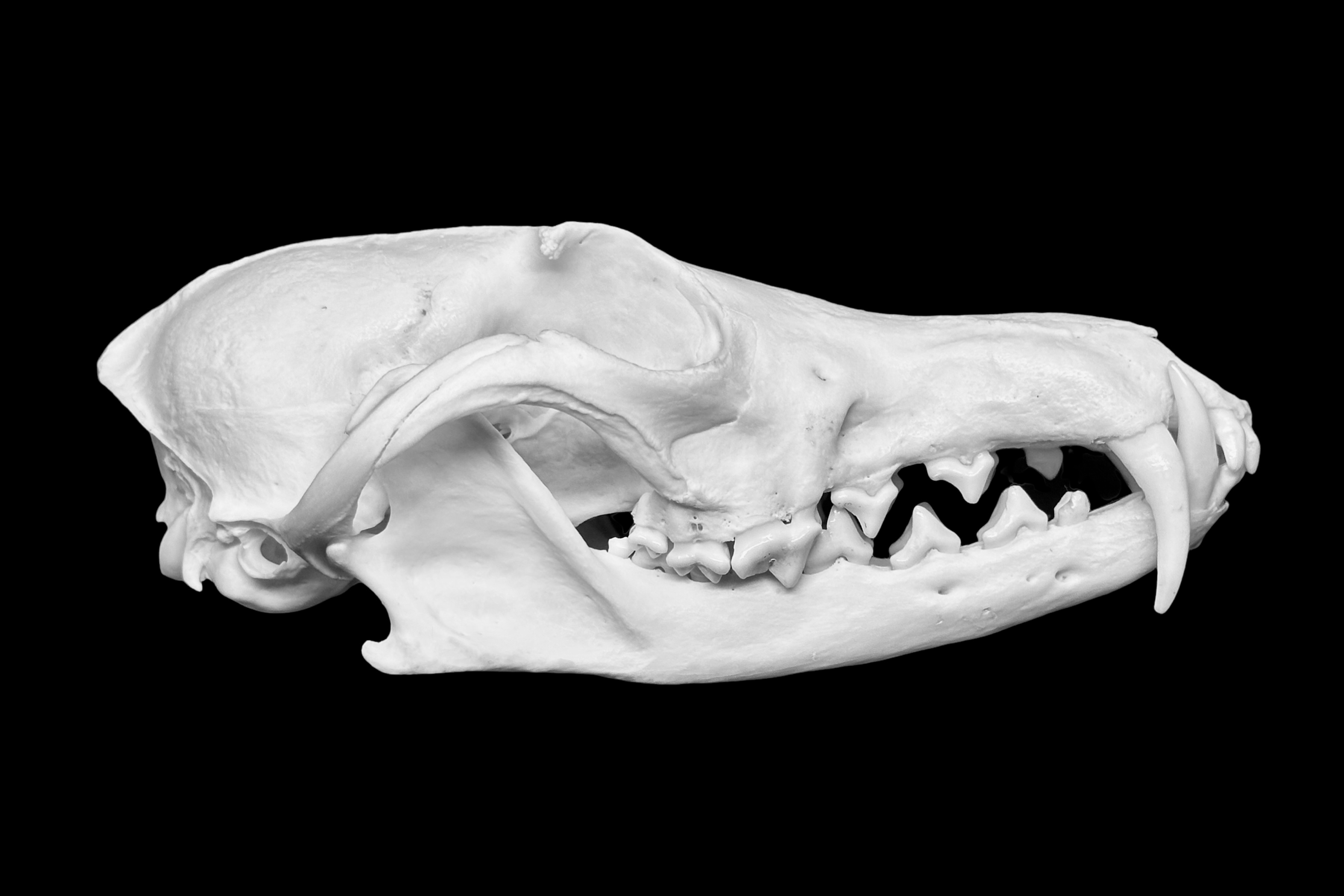
Side view of a Tibetan fox skull

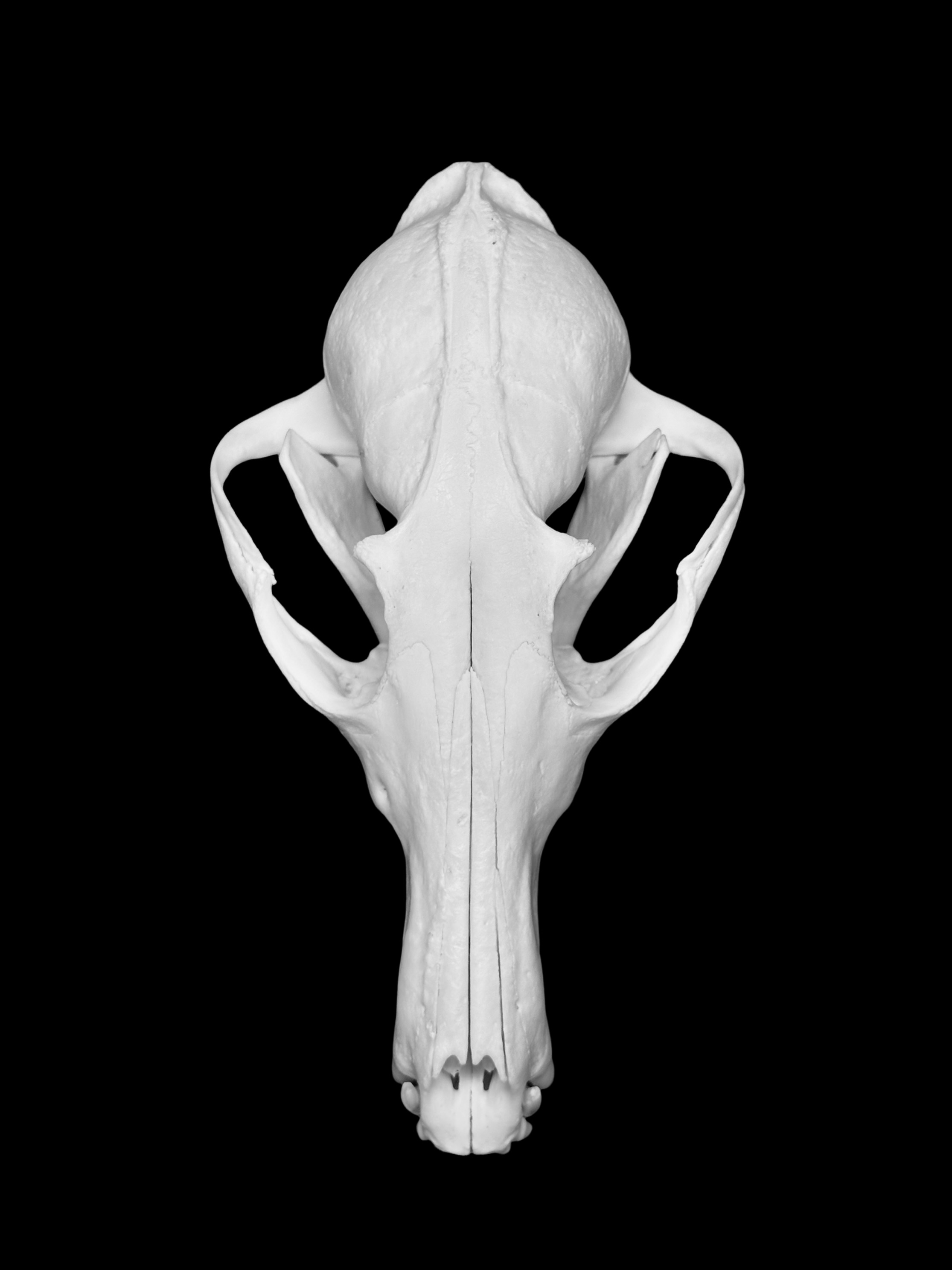
Top view of a Tibetan Fox skull

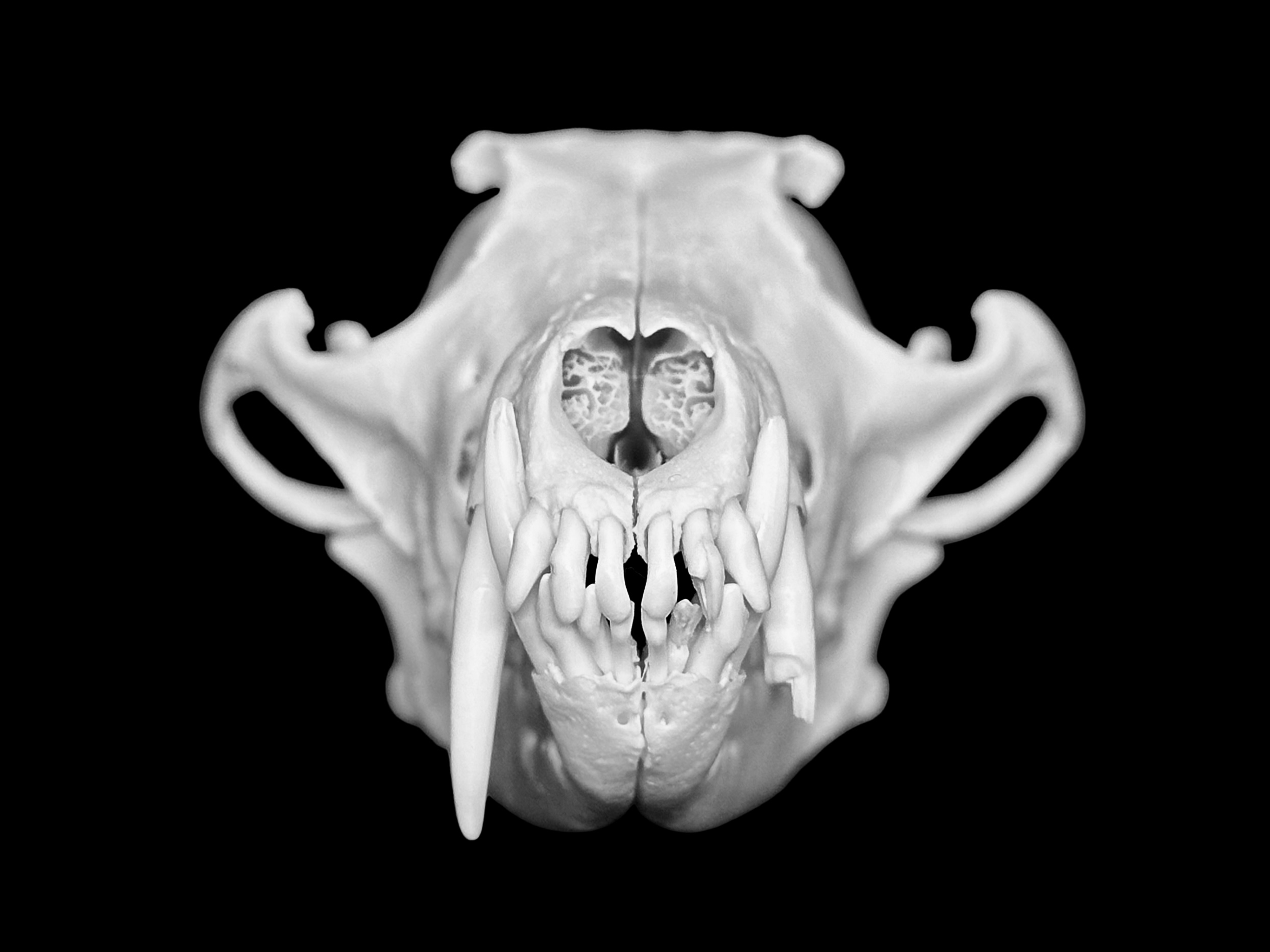
Front view of a Tibetan fox skull

== Taxonomy ==
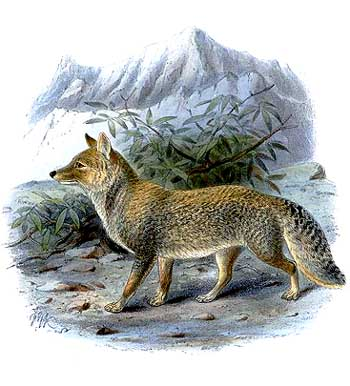
Illustration of Tibetan fox by John Gerrard Keulemans, 1890

Tibetan fox is one of 12 extant Vulpes species and a member of the family Canidae. The cladogram below is based on the phylogeny of Lindblad-Toh (2005) modified to incorporate recent findings on Vulpes.

Tibetan fox within Vulpes
- Vulpes
  - - Vulpes zerda (Fennec fox)
    - Vulpes cana (Blanford's fox)
  - - Vulpes chama (Cape fox)
    - - - - Vulpes vulpes (Red fox)
          - Vulpes rueppellii (Rüppell's fox)
        - - Vulpes corsac (Corsac fox)
          - Vulpes ferrilata (Tibetan fox)
      - - Vulpes macrotis (Kit fox)
        - Vulpes lagopus (Arctic fox)

== Distribution and habitat ==
The Tibetan fox is restricted to the Tibetan Plateau in western China and the Ladakh plateau and Sikkim in India. It occurs north of the Himalayas in the northernmost border regions of Nepal and India, across Tibet, and in parts of the Chinese provinces of Qinghai, Gansu, Xinjiang, Yunnan and Sichuan. It primarily inhabits semi-arid to arid grasslands, well away from humans or from heavy vegetation cover. It lives in upland plains and hills from 3,500 to 5,200 m (11,500 to 17,100 ft) elevation, and has occasionally been sighted at elevations of around 2,500 m (8,200 ft).

Due to the generalized nature of the Tibetan fox, its distribution has been greatly affected by climate change. Due to the rising temperatures of the Tibetan Plateau, its suitable habitat has shifted towards higher elevations on the plateau. This has caused its range to further overlap with the red fox (Vulpes vulpes) and increased the competition between the two species.

== Behaviour and ecology ==
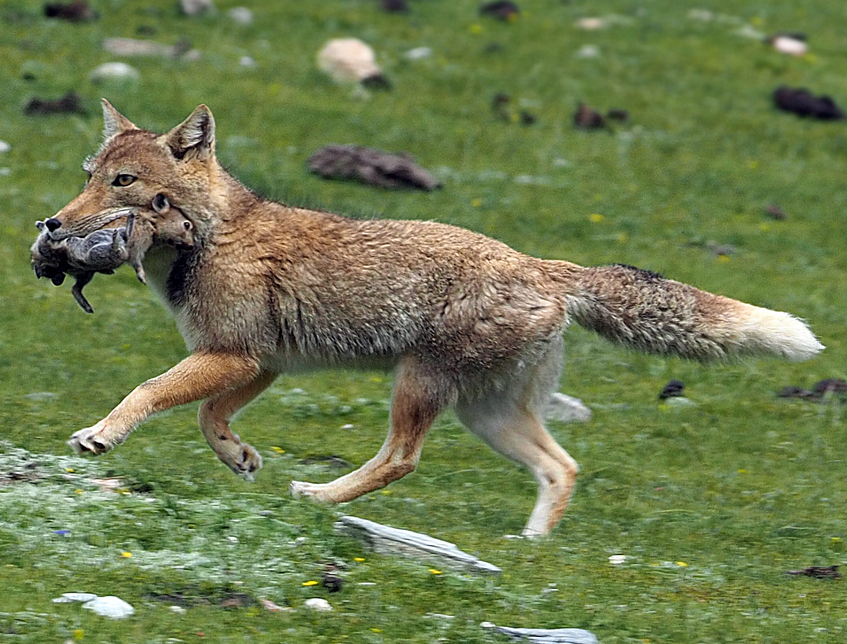
Tibetan fox with a plateau pika in its mouth

The Tibetan fox primarily preys on plateau pikas, followed by rodents, marmots, woolly hares, rabbits, small ground birds and lizards. It also scavenges on the carcasses of Tibetan antelopes, musk deer, blue sheep and livestock. Tibetan foxes are mostly solitary, daytime hunters as their main prey, pikas, are diurnal. Tibetan foxes may form commensal relationships with brown bears during hunts for pikas. The bears dig out the pikas, and the foxes grab them when they escape the bears.

Mated pairs remain together and may also hunt together. After a gestation period of about 50 to 60 days, two to four young are born in a den, and stay with the parents until they are eight to ten months old. Their burrows are made at the base of boulders, at old beach lines and low slopes. Dens may have four entrances, with entrances being 25–35 cm (9.8–13.8 in) in diameter.

=== Diseases and parasites ===
Tibetan foxes in the Sêrxü County of China's Sichuan province are heavily infected with Echinococcus, while foxes in western Sichuan are definitive hosts of alveolar hydatid disease.
