= Pale fox =

- Taxidermy specimen at Grande Galerie de l’Évolution, Paris

Conservation status
- Least Concern (IUCN 3.1)

Scientific classification
- Kingdom: Animalia
- Phylum: Chordata
- Class: Mammalia
- Order: Carnivora
- Family: Canidae
- Genus: Vulpes
- Species: V. pallida

Binomial name
- Vulpes pallida (Cretzschmar, 1827)
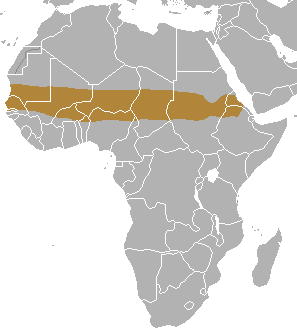
- Pale fox range

Synonyms
- Canis pallidus; Vulpes pallidus; Fennecus pallidus

Species of carnivore

The pale fox (Vulpes pallida) is a species of fox found in the band of African Sahel from Senegal in the west to Sudan in the east. It is one of the least studied of all canid species, in part due to its remote habitat and its sandy coat that blends in well with the desert-like terrain. The pale fox is distinguished by its light-colored fur and oversized ears, which enable it to excel in camouflage and survival in harsh environments.

Individuals of the species serve as key predators and scavengers. Despite being lesser known, the pale fox is considered a significant indicator of an ecosystem's health and a focal point for conservation interests.

== Subspecies ==
There are five recognized subspecies:

- Vulpes pallida pallida
- Vulpes pallida cyrenaica
- Vulpes pallida edwardsi
- Vulpes pallida harterti
- Vulpes pallida oertzeni

== Description ==
Depicted in 1890 illustration

The pale fox is a small fox, with a long body and relatively short legs and a narrow muzzle. The fur is quite thin, with a pale sandy color that turns white towards the abdomen. The back is often speckled with a blackish or a rufous coloration, with a darker mid-dorsal line. The flanks are paler than the dorsal pelage, blending into buffy-white underparts, and the legs are rufous. It has a pale face, an elongated muzzle with relatively long whiskers, and a dark ring surrounding the eye. Its sandy-colored fur offers effective camouflage within the desert landscape, blending seamlessly with the dunes and rocky terrain.

Its tail is long and bushy, with a reddish-brown color with a prominent black tip and a dark patch above the tail gland. The skull is small with a relatively short maxillary region and small sharp canine teeth. One of the most prominent features of the species, its ears, are large, and triangular compared to other foxes but such a shape is typical of a desert inhabiting canid. The ears of the pale fox play a crucial role, both in thermoregulation, by releasing heat in their typically warm habitats, and in increasing their hearing acuity to detect prey and predators.

Head and body length is 38 to 55 cm (15 to 22 in), tail length is 23 to 29 cm (9.1 to 11.4 in), and weight 2.0 to 3.6 kg (4.4 to 7.9 lb).

== Distribution and habitat ==
Pale fox is distributed in the semi-arid Sahelian region of Africa bordering the Sahara Desert, from Mauritania and Senegal via Nigeria, Cameroon and Chad to the Red Sea. The southern border of its range extends to the savanna zones of northern Guinea. It is also present in Benin, Burkina Faso, Eritrea, Ethiopia, Gambia, Mali, Niger, South Sudan and Sudan. The habitat is sandy or stony arid terrain, and the pale fox is able to relocate southwards and northwards in relation to the periodic droughts that affect these regions.

== Reproduction ==
The pale fox, similar to other species, exhibits unique reproductive behaviors influenced by its desert environment and the challenges this poses for its young. These foxes are monogamous, often forming pair bonds with mates that can last for several breeding seasons. Typically, they breed during the cooler months, a timing that corresponds with seasonal variations in various factors, one of which being food availability.

Once mating has concluded, the female pale fox often excavates a burrow or occupies existing underground dens to birth her pups. The gestation period usually spans 50 to 60 days, and litter sizes for pale foxes typically vary from three to six pups. While larger litters are uncommon, they have been observed. Newborn pups are inherently blind and deaf immediately following birth, thus making them completely dependent on their mother. Their average life span is no more than 10 years.

== Behavior and diet ==
The pale fox species exhibits a vast array of behaviors and dietary preferences adapted to desert environments. These nocturnal creatures are most active during the cooler nights, avoiding the intense heat of the day. They are known for their complex communication with conspecifics, which includes vocalizations, visual displays, and scent marking to establish territories. Additionally, pale foxes engage in social grooming and playful interactions, especially within family groups. During the mating season, they are more tolerant of other individuals near their territories.

Pale foxes depend on stealth and agility to catch their prey. Typically, their prey, varied and distinctive, includes birds, reptiles, insects, and small mammals. Their diet can also consist of fruits, seeds, and carrion, which they scavenge within their desert habitat.

== Ecology ==
The pale fox is crucial to its ecosystem, serving as both a predator and scavenger. Typically found in stony deserts and semi-deserts, it sometimes wanders into the savanna. In these habitats, the pale fox helps regulate prey populations, affecting their abundance and distribution. This regulation, in turn, indirectly influences soil and vegetation dynamics, which contributes to the health of the desert environments in which they live. In addition, pale foxes contribute to nutrient cycling and energy flow. Their predation and consumption habits lead to the redistribution of nutrients throughout their habitat, enhancing plant growth and the overall productivity of the ecosystem. They also aid in nutrient recycling by incorporating carrion and other organic waste into their diet.

The pale foxes can be considered prey to other larger predators, such as jackals, raptors, and other large carnivores, which allows them to also contribute to the food web structure of the desert environment to which they call home. They are gregarious, living in shared burrows, probably in small family groups with parents and their young. During the day they rest in dug burrows that can extend up to 15 meters long and descend up to 2 meters to the ground, at dusk they venture out and forage for food.

== Status ==
Although the abundance of the pale fox is unknown, it seems to be a common species throughout its wide range. The International Union for Conservation of Nature has rated its conservation status as being of "least concern". However, the pale fox species is increasingly threatened by habitat loss, fragmentation, and human encroachment. These challenges are compounded by the escalating threat of climate change and competition from other introduced species in the common pale fox habitats.

In response to escalating threats, numerous conservation initiatives have been undertaken to safeguard the habitats of pale foxes, while also reducing human-wildlife conflicts and enhancing awareness about the critical importance of desert biodiversity. Through the implementation of these measures, in partnership with local communities, governments, and conservation organizations, it can be ensured that the pale fox population remains robust and flourishes for years to come.
