= Prairie fox =

Prairie fox may refer to:

- Kit fox
- Swift fox
