= Southern California kit fox =

Conservation status
- Extinct (1903)

Scientific classification
- Kingdom: Animalia
- Phylum: Chordata
- Class: Mammalia
- Order: Carnivora
- Family: Canidae
- Genus: Vulpes
- Species: V. macrotis
- Subspecies: †V. m. macrotis

Trinomial name
- †Vulpes macrotis macrotis Merriam, 1888

Synonyms
- Vulpes velox macrotis

Extinct subspecies of kit fox

The Southern California kit fox (Vulpes macrotis macrotis) or long-eared kit fox is an extinct subspecies of kit fox native to Southern California and northern Baja California.

== Taxonomy ==
The kit fox was described by Clinton Hart Merriam in 1888 based on a specimen apparently killed in Riverside, California, by Frank Stephens. He believed kit foxes were a species that originated in Mexico and extended northwards to California. Before Merriam's description, the kit fox had been largely overlooked in Southern California, much to his shock. The Southern California kit fox is the nominate subspecies of the kit fox. In 1933, Joseph Grinnell updated his list of California mammals to include newly described mammals excluded in his 1913 and 1923 lists. Stephens provided more information on the type locality of the kit fox in the 1933 list, which is "more exactly, on western margin of the San Jacinto Plain in vicinity of Box Springs, within 10 miles south-east of Riverside".

Kit foxes have been classified as conspecific with the swift fox. The Southern California kit fox is classified as Vulpes velox macrotis when using this classification. The generic name Vulpes is Latin for "fox", while macrotis is Greek for "big-eared".

== Description ==
The Southern California kit fox resembled the swift fox in general appearance but had larger ears, a smaller hindfoot, and brighter fur.
