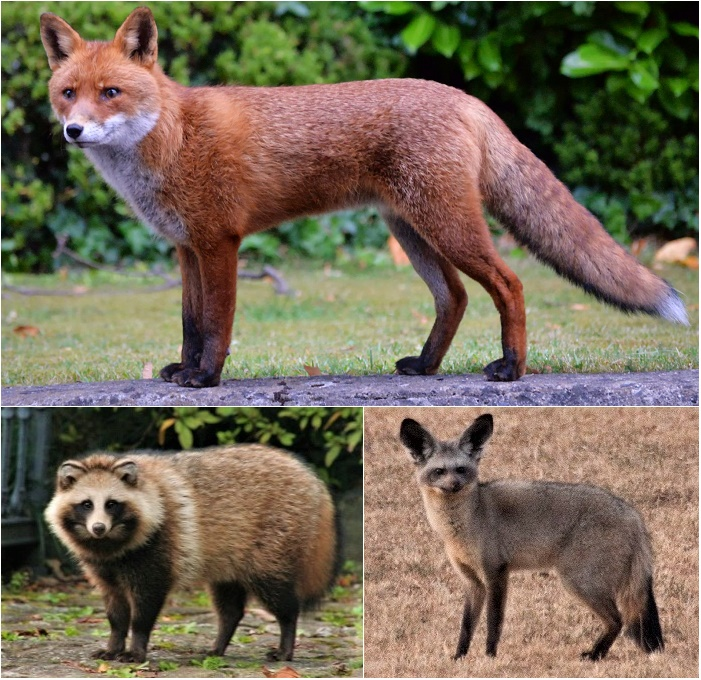
- Clockwise from top: red fox, bat-eared fox, tanuki

Scientific classification
- Kingdom: Animalia
- Phylum: Chordata
- Class: Mammalia
- Order: Carnivora
- Family: Canidae
- Subfamily: Caninae
- Tribe: Vulpini; Hemprich and Ehrenberg, 1832

Genera
- †Ferrucyon; †Metalopex Tedford, Wang, & Taylor 2008; Nyctereutes; Otocyon; †Prototocyon; Vulpes

= Vulpini =

Vulpins

Tribe of carnivores, most called 'fox'

Vulpini is a tribe which represents the fox-like taxon of the subfamily Caninae (the canines), and is sister to the dog-like tribe Canini. It comprises the 15 extant and 21 extinct species found on all continents except Antarctica.

== Genera ==
Image	Genus	Species
	Nyctereutes Temminck, 1838	Nyctereutes procyonoides; Nyctereutes viverrinus; †Nyctereutes abdeslami; †Nyctereutes donnezani; †Nyctereutes lockwoodi; †Nyctereutes megamastoides; †Nyctereutes sinensis; †Nyctereutes tingi; †Nyctereutes vinetorum
	Otocyon S. Müller, 1835	Otocyon megalotis
	Vulpes Garsault, 1764	Vulpes bengalensis; Vulpes cana; Vulpes chama; Vulpes corsac; Vulpes ferrilata; Vulpes lagopus; Vulpes macrotis; Vulpes pallida; Vulpes rueppellii; Vulpes velox; Vulpes vulpes; Vulpes zerda; †Vulpes hassani; †Vulpes praeglacialis; †Vulpes qiuzhudingi; †Vulpes riffautae; †Vulpes rooki; †Vulpes skinneri; †Vulpes stenognathus
	†Ferrucyon Ruiz-Ramoni et al., 2020	†Ferrucyon avius
	†Metalopex S. Müller, 1835	†Metalopex bakeri Tedford et al. 2009; †Metalopex macconnelli Tedford et al. 2009; †Metalopex merriami Tedford and Wang, 2008
	†Prototocyon Pohle, 1928	†Prototocyon curvipalatus; †Prototocyon recki

== Taxonomy ==
The taxonomy of Carnivora in general and Canidae in particular correlates with various diagnostic features of the dentition and basicranium. Regarding Vulpini, Tedford has remarked:

These small canids are distinguished from all other Caninae in possessing a wide paroccipital process that is broadly sutured to the posterior surface of the bulla with a short and laterally turned free tip that barely extends below the body of the process. The presence of a metaconule and postprotocrista on M2 of vulpines represents the culmination of a reversal that began with late Leptocyon species to resume the form of the primitive canine M2.

— Richard H. Tedford

The cladogram below is based on the phylogeny of Lindblad-Toh (2005) modified to incorporate recent findings on Vulpes.

- Vulpini
  - Otocyon megalotis (bat-eared fox)
  - - Nyctereutes (raccoon dogs)
    - Vulpes
      - - Vulpes zerda (fennec fox)
        - Vulpes cana (Blanford's fox)
      - - Vulpes chama (Cape fox)
        - - - - Vulpes vulpes (red fox)
              - Vulpes rueppellii (Ruppell's fox)
            - - Vulpes corsac (corsac fox)
              - Vulpes ferrilata (Tibetan fox)
          - - Vulpes macrotis (kit fox)
            - Vulpes lagopus (Arctic fox)
