= Common fox =

Common fox may refer to:

- Crab-eating fox
- Red fox
