= Ferrucyon =

Ferrucyon Temporal range: Pliocene (Blancan) ~4.9–2.6 Ma

Scientific classification
- Kingdom: Animalia
- Phylum: Chordata
- Class: Mammalia
- Order: Carnivora
- Family: Canidae
- Genus: †Ferrucyon; Ruiz-Ramoni et al., 2020
- Species: †F. avius

Binomial name
- †Ferrucyon avius (Tedford et al. 2009)

Extinct species of carnivore

Ferrucyon is an extinct genus of omnivorous mammal of the family Canidae, which inhabited North America during the Pliocene, Blancan in the NALMA classification, from about 4.9 to approximately 2.6 Ma. The type species, F. avius, was originally interpreted as a relative of the modern crab-eating fox, and described as a species belonging to the genus Cerdocyon. Ruiz-Ramoni et al. (2020) reinterpreted it as a vulpine canid related to North American species Metalopex macconnelli, and to the Eurasian genus Nyctereutes. This reinterpretation necessitated removal of "Cerdocyon" avius from the genus Cerdocyon, and Ruiz-Ramoni et al. (2020) transferred it to the separate genus Ferrucyon.

== Taxonomy ==
Cerdocyon was named by Hamilton-Smith (1839). It was assigned to Canidae by Hamilton-Smith (1839) and Carroll (1988).

F. avius was about 80 centimetres (2.6 ft) long. Fossils of the species have been found in Baja California (Refugio Formation).
