= Nyctereutes vulpinus =

Nyctereutes vulpinus Temporal range: Early Pleistocene

Scientific classification
- Kingdom: Animalia
- Phylum: Chordata
- Class: Mammalia
- Infraclass: Placentalia
- Order: Carnivora
- Family: Canidae
- Genus: Nyctereutes
- Species: †N. vulpinus

Binomial name
- †Nyctereutes vulpinus Soria and Aguirre, 1976

Extinct species of Nyctereutes

Nyctereutes vulpinus is an extinct species of vulpin canine in the genus Nyctereutes that lived in Europe during the Pleistocene epoch.

== Distribution ==
N. vulpinus is known from the Early Pleistocene of France, Spain, and Greece.
