= Metalopex =

Metalopex Temporal range: Late Miocene

Scientific classification
- Kingdom: Animalia
- Phylum: Chordata
- Class: Mammalia
- Order: Carnivora
- Family: Canidae
- Tribe: Vulpini
- Genus: †Metalopex; Tedford and Wang, 2008

Species
- Metalopex bakeri Tedford et al. 2009; Metalopex macconnelli Tedford et al. 2009; Metalopex merriami Tedford and Wang, 2008

Extinct genus of carnivores

Metalopex is an extinct hypocarnivorous canid mammal similar to Vulpes endemic to Late Miocene North America. Its sister taxon is the extant Urocyon; together, the two genera form a clade based on dentition. These same dental characteristics are shared by Otocyon and Protocyon.
