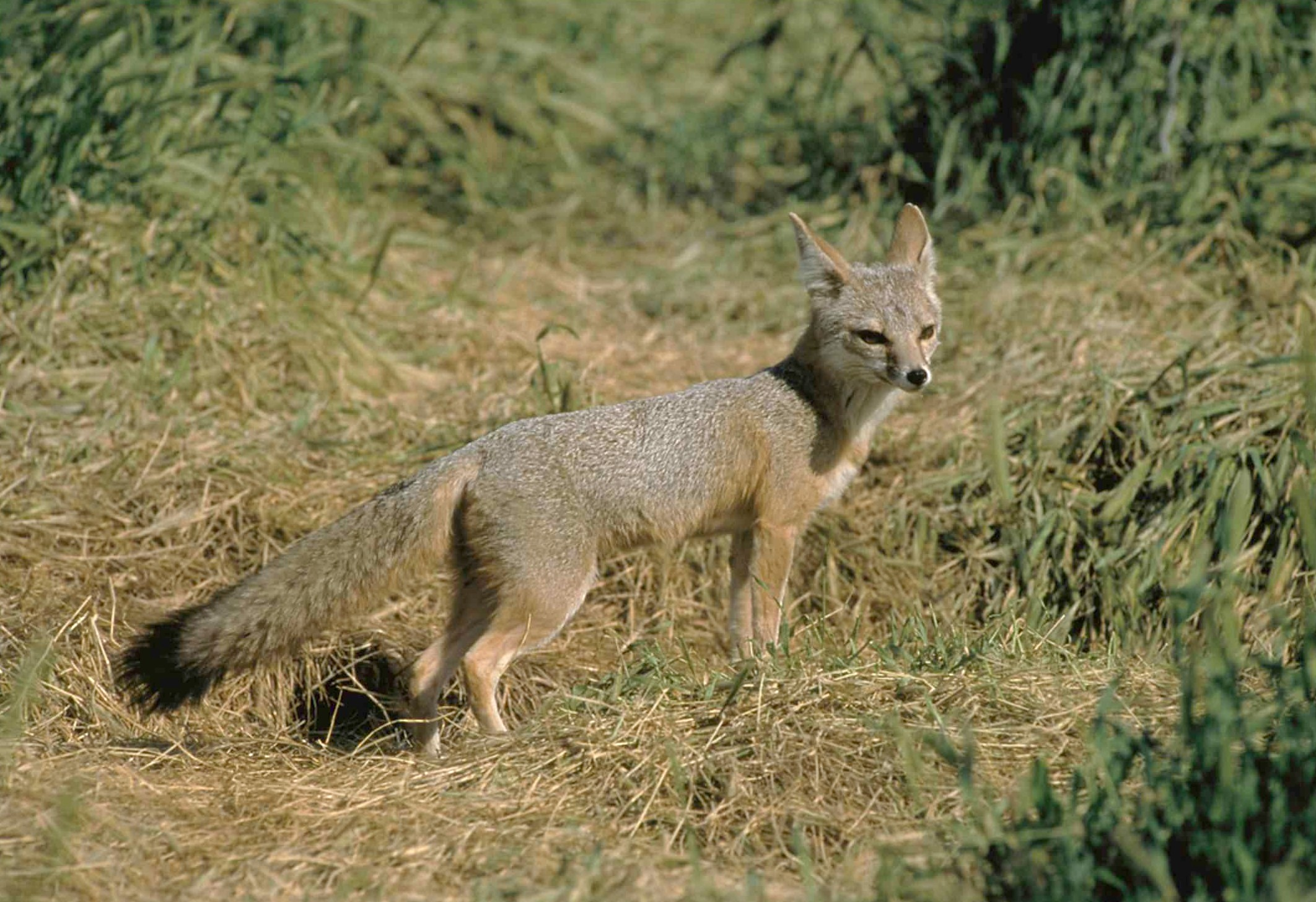
- Male San Joaquin kit fox

Conservation status
- Endangered (ESA)

Scientific classification
- Kingdom: Animalia
- Phylum: Chordata
- Class: Mammalia
- Order: Carnivora
- Family: Canidae
- Genus: Vulpes
- Species: V. macrotis
- Subspecies: V. m. mutica

Trinomial name
- Vulpes macrotis mutica Merriam, 1902

= San Joaquin kit fox =

Subspecies of mammal

The San Joaquin kit fox (Vulpes macrotis mutica) is an endangered subspecies of kit fox that was formerly very common in the San Joaquin Valley and much of Central California. As an opportunistic hunter, the San Joaquin kit fox primarily preys on kangaroo rats but also targets white-footed mice, pocket mice, ground squirrels, rabbits, and ground-nesting birds. During certain times of the year, especially when other food sources might be scarce, it will also consume insects. Its 1990 population was estimated to be 7,000. This subspecies is still endangered, after nearly 50 years of being on the Endangered Species List. Officially this subspecies was listed March 3, 1967. On September 26, 2007, Wildlands Inc. announced the designation of the 684-acre (2.77 km^{2}) Deadman Creek Conservation Bank, which is intended specifically to protect habitat of the San Joaquin kit fox. However, the population continues to decline mostly due to heavy habitat loss. Other factors include competition from red fox, and the extermination of the gray wolf from California has left the coyote as the dominant meso-predator in kit fox territory bringing an imbalance in ecosystem relationships. Sarcoptic mange has also constituted a significant threat, specifically to the Bakersfield population of the subspecies, with 15 confirmed cases reported by the end of 2014.

== Taxonomy and distribution ==
Historically, it has mostly occupied in the San Joaquin Valley from southern Kern County north to Tracy, San Joaquin County, on the west side, and near La Grange, Stanislaus County, on the east side. Yet, its ranges has been shrinking down in size in the past years. By 1930 its range is mostly believed to be reduced by more than half, with the largest remaining portion being the western and southern portions of the Valley. And in 1979, only 6.7% of land south of Stanislaus County remained undeveloped. The current largest populations of San Joaquin kit fox is living around the western Kern County on and around the Elk Hills and Buena Vista Valley. Though no continuous monitoring within the central and northern portions of the habit range, populations were recorded in the late 1980s.

== Description ==
San Joaquin kit fox, a subspecies of the kit fox, which is the smallest species of dog family in North America. It has a body length average of 20 inches; 12 of those inches are its tail length. Its height ranges from 9 to 12 inches at the shoulder and its adult body weight is about 5 pounds for males and 4.6 pounds for females. It is known for its conspicuously large ears. From a sample of 21 tracks from the San Joaquin Valley, the average length of foot pads of the San Joaquin kit fox is about 3.1 centimeters with an average width of 2.6 centimeters, which is comparable smaller than the other canids, foxes, wolves, jackals, etc. The remaining physical appearance characteristics includes its long legs, slim body, pointed and slim nose, and low carried tail. While San Joaquin kit fox's coat colors may vary by range and season, primarily they appear more tan in summer and grey in winter with the external ear flap being dark on the back sides and white hairs on the forward-inner border and base.

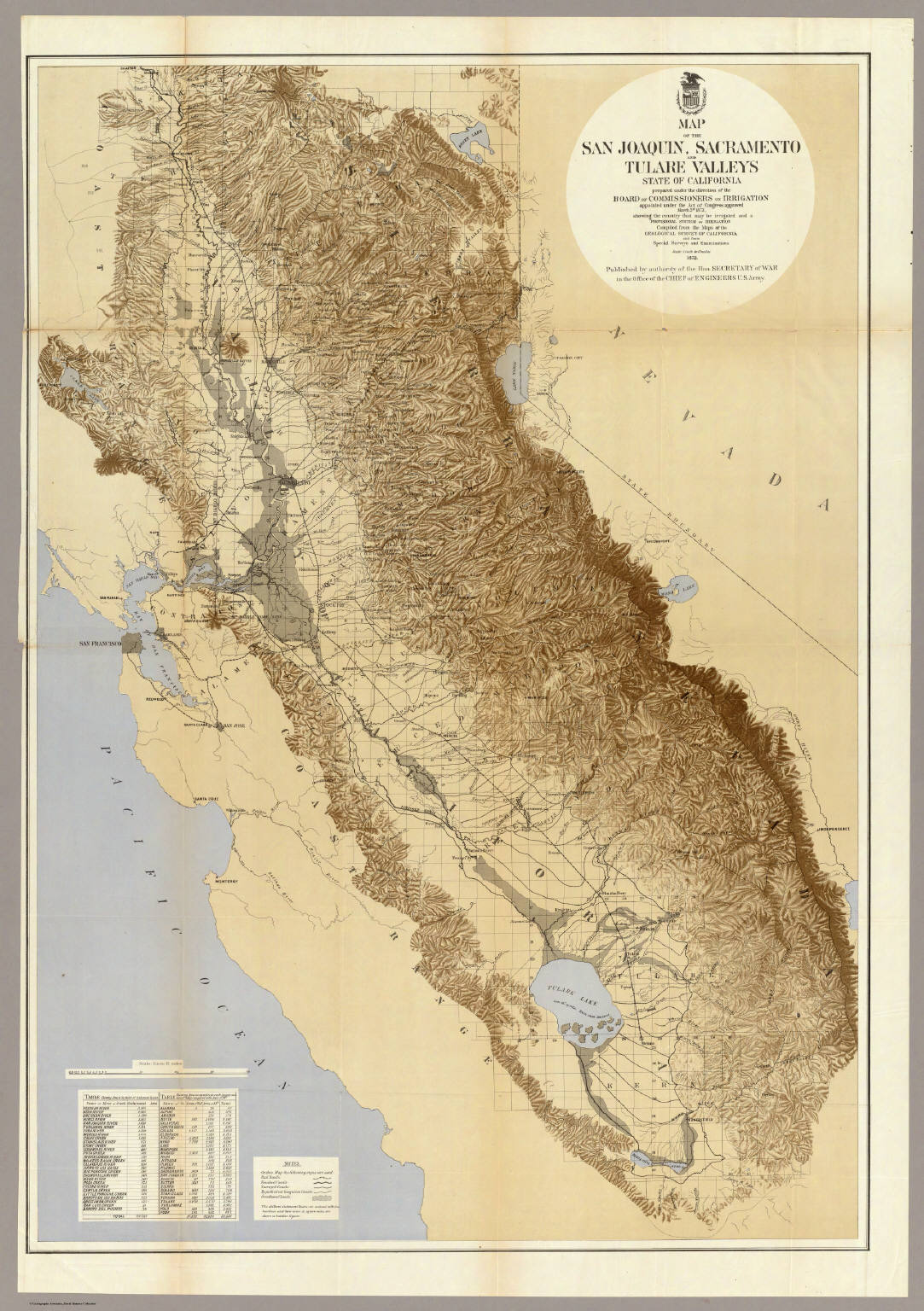
The San Joaquin Valley

== Behavior and life history ==
The San Joaquin kit fox tends to favor open grassland or scrubland, where it inhabits dens and feeds on prey such as field mice, kangaroo rats, ground squirrels and insects for some cases and mostly active at night. Their dens usually appear to be complex and deep with multiple openings that provide them with temperature regulation, shelter from the severe environmental conditions, protection from predators, and a place for reproduction. A study of the San Joaquin kit fox with GIS (Geographic Information Systems) mentions about how the kit foxes can change between various dens throughout the month, and the use of numerous dens seems to be one of their survival strategies. And its diet appears to vary geographically, seasonally and annually based upon the temporal and spatial availability of prey. In addition to their diet, their activity also varies seasonally. For instance, it is more often observed during the day in the late spring and early summer each year, despite it being considered primarily nocturnal. While a San Joaquin kit fox might not breed in its first year, its ability to reproduce begins when it is one year old. The mating period is usually between late December and March with a median gestation period that can range from 48 to 52 days with a result of 2 to 6 pups. The pups emerge from the den for the first time soon after their first month, and after 4 to 5 months, they begin dispersing, while occasionally young females remain with the adult female for several more months.

== Threats and challenges ==
=== Habitat loss ===
The San Joaquin kit fox is a native species that once thrived across the Central Valley, encompassing over millions of acres of grasslands, shrublands, and wetlands. However, human activities have drastically altered this landscape. Only 4,140 km2 of high suitability habitat and 7,268 km2 of medium suitability habitat remain for San Joaquin kit foxes, and much of this habitat is highly fragmented. Agricultural development has been a primary driver, with the San Joaquin Valley now accounting for a substantial portion of California's agricultural output. For example, in the San Joaquin Valley there's mass farming of almonds that take up a large amount of desert land and make it uninhabitable for the local native desert fauna. Urban expansion further compounds the issue. For instance, Bakersfield is currently the largest city within the range of the kit fox with a population of 380,000. However, the urban and suburban Bakersfield area has expanded to comprise approximately 70 percent of the Metropolitan Bakersfield satellite area for the kit fox. The consequence of such profound habitat transformation has been the fragmentation and isolation of kit fox populations. This not only limits the fox's range but also creates barriers that impede movement, restrict gene flow, and increase mortality risks. Today, much of the kit fox's movement corridors are degraded or blocked, and only a few large areas of native grasslands remain on the San Joaquin Valley's perimeter, underscoring the urgent need for comprehensive conservation efforts.

An additional threat to the habitat of the San Joaquin Kit Fox is the expansion of fracking. In late 2012 the Bureau of Land Management auctioned off Land in the Monterey Shale which houses many endangered species including the San Joaquin Kit Fox. The construction of fracking facilities disrupt and separate the environment of the San Joaquin Kit Fox while the operation of these facilities release dangerous chemicals which pollute the local ecosystem. Environmentalists attempted to sue the department for not conducting an environmental impact report but their efforts were in vain and the project went through.

=== Rodenticides and pesticides ===
The use of rodenticides and pesticides presents a significant threat to the San Joaquin kit fox, especially given the creature's close proximity to areas of human activity. Rodenticides, particularly anticoagulant rodenticides, are chemicals used to control rodent populations. For example, kit foxes may be killed if they ingest rodenticide in a bait application, or if they consume rodents that have consumed bait. Reports by the California Department of Pesticide Regulation document at least 76 separate incidents of San Joaquin kit fox poisonings from super-toxic rodenticides. In the Bakersfield area more than 87 percent of kit foxes have been exposed to these toxins.

Pesticides, which are designed to eliminate or control pests, can also have detrimental effects on non-target species like the San Joaquin kit fox. The vast agricultural expanse of the San Joaquin Valley relies heavily on pesticide use. Ingesting prey contaminated with pesticides or directly consuming these chemicals from the environment can harm and kill the fox. Plausible scenarios for exposure to pesticides suggest a reduction in kit fox populations by approximately 13%. Additionally, based on a Modeled Kit Fox Populations, 36% of the modeled foxes become exposed, resulting in a 7–18% decline in the range-wide kit fox population that can be linked to rodenticide use.

=== Diseases ===
Diseases have been a concern for the San Joaquin kit fox. One of the most notable diseases affecting the San Joaquin kit fox is Mange. Mange – a skin condition caused by parasitic mites—leads to hair loss, open wounds from scratching and, ultimately, death. The first case was detected among the kit fox population in March 2013 and the epidemic has grown worse every year. Luckily, although mortality from this outbreak is high (70% overall and 100% without veterinary intervention), thus far it appears to be largely limited to Bakersfield.

Another significant health concern for the San Joaquin kit fox is rabies, a viral disease that affects the central nervous system. An outbreak of this disease, detected among striped skunks (Mephitis mephitis), may have contributed to a 5-fold decrease in the relative abundance of kit foxes at Camp Roberts Army National Guard Training Site, California, during 1988–1991. Exposure to other wildlife, contaminated environments, or even domestic animals can result in the transmission of these and other diseases, emphasizing the importance of disease monitoring and management in conservation efforts.

=== Climate change ===
Climate change affects San Joaquin kit fox through changes in precipitation and temperature, which can drive associated changes to vegetative communities as well alterations to prey species abundance and composition. In California, annual average temperatures have increased by about 2.5 degrees Fahrenheit (°F). This increase in temperature can lead to changes in the habitats and distribution of the kit fox's primary prey, potentially reducing food availability and forcing the fox to expand its search for sustenance. Additionally, altered precipitation patterns, with intensified precipitation patterns (for example, larger but fewer rainfall events) and more frequent and extreme drought, threaten the ecosystem balance of the valley. Several severe drought events in California in the past decade have affected water sources and vegetation that the San Joaquin kit fox relies on. These climatic shifts can further fragment habitats, making it challenging for isolated fox populations to find mates or access vital resources.

== Conservation efforts ==
=== Legal protections ===
The San Joaquin kit fox is listed as an endangered species that is protected under the Endangered Species Preservation Act of 1966, a precursor to the Endangered Species Act. This listing prohibits activities that would harm, harass, or lead to the "take" (i.e., harm or kill) of these foxes without appropriate federal authorization. It is also an endangered species that is protected under the California Endangered Species Act (CESA), providing an extra layer of protection at the state level. Additionally, The US Fish and Wildlife Service provides standardized recommendations for protection of the San Joaquin kit fox prior to or during ground disturbance. These recommendations include survey protocols, burrow mapping, and exclusion fencing.

These legal safeguards mandate the development and implementation of recovery plans, the identification of critical habitats, and measures to mitigate potential harms from development and other activities in the San Joaquin Valley.

=== NGOs and government program ===
- The San Joaquin Kit Fox Conservation Program: This program is a collaborative effort between the U.S. Fish and Wildlife Service, the California Department of Fish and Wildlife, and other partners to conserve the San Joaquin kit fox and its habitat.
- The Endangered Species Recovery Program: This program is a joint effort between the California Department of Fish and Wildlife and the University of California, Davis to recover endangered species in California, including the San Joaquin kit fox.
- The San Joaquin Valley Habitat Conservation Plan: This plan is a multi-agency effort to conserve habitat for endangered species in the San Joaquin Valley, including the San Joaquin kit fox.

== Cultural significance ==
The indigenous peoples of the San Joaquin Valley, such as the Yokuts, held specific reverence or stories tied to local fauna such as the kit fox.

=== Gallery ===
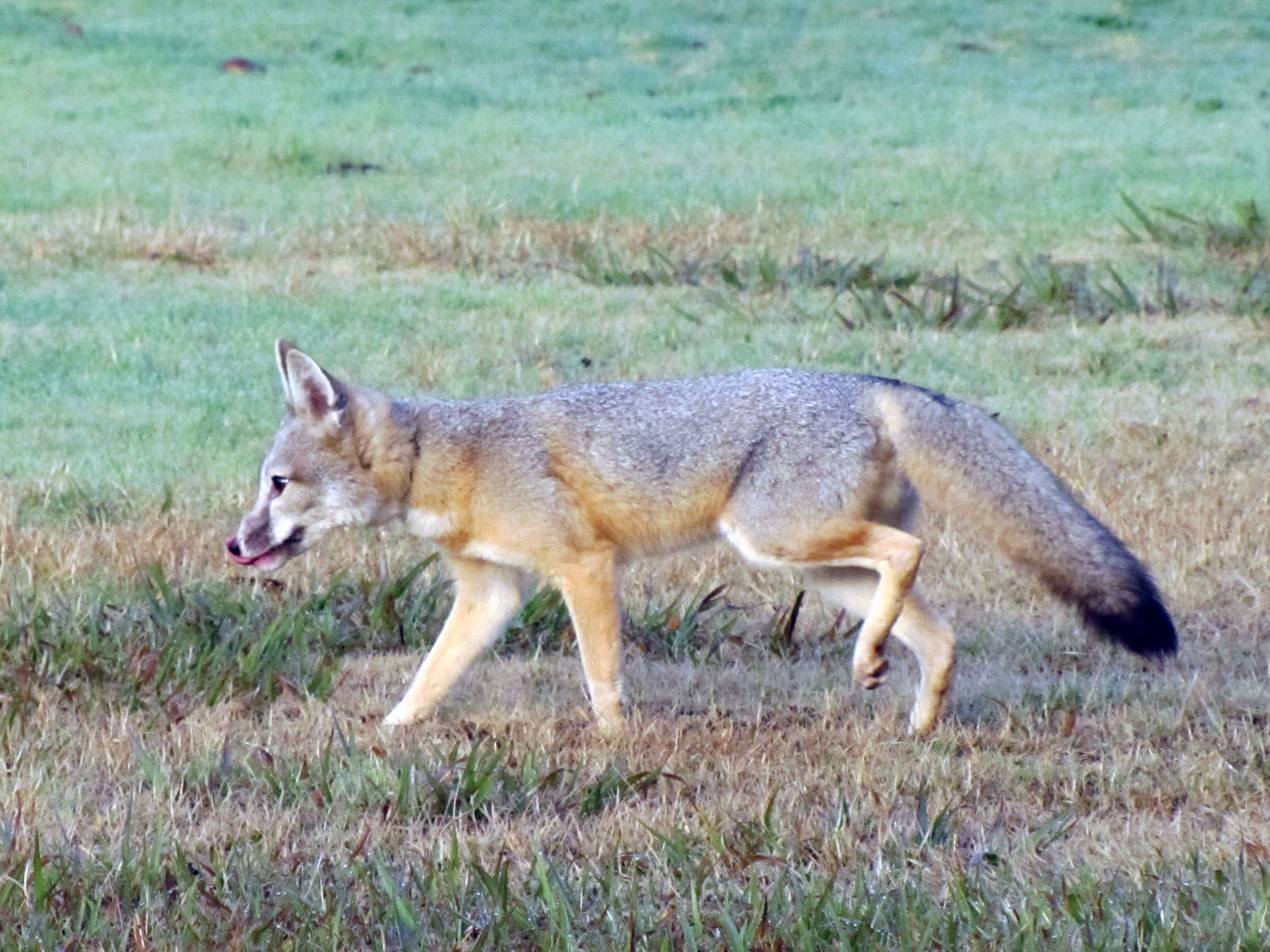
V. m. mutica male

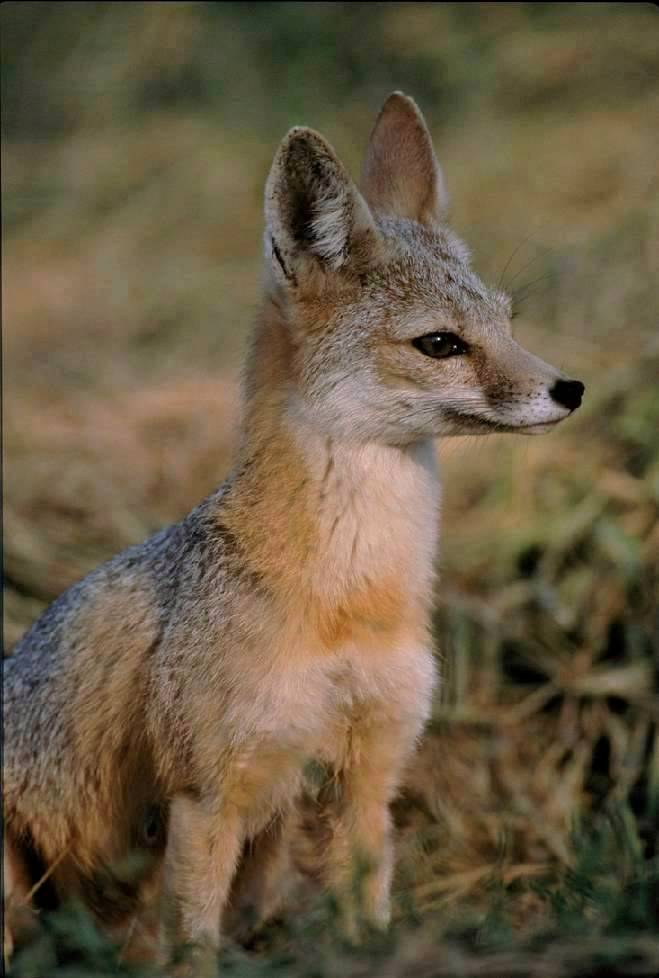
V. m. mutica sitting

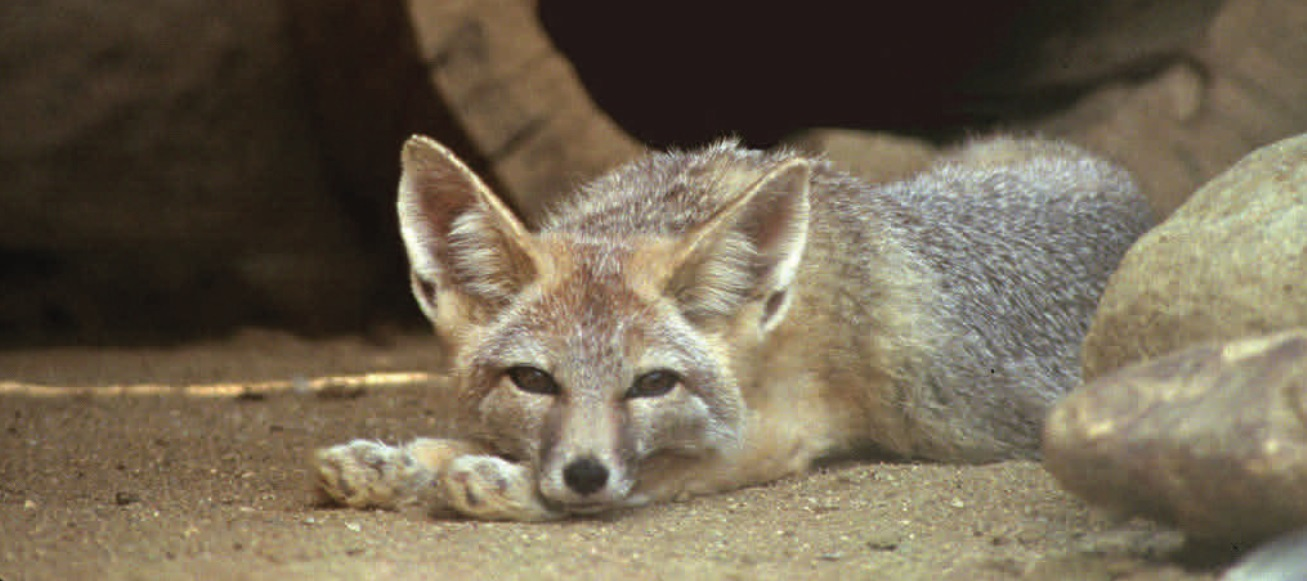
V. m. mutica resting

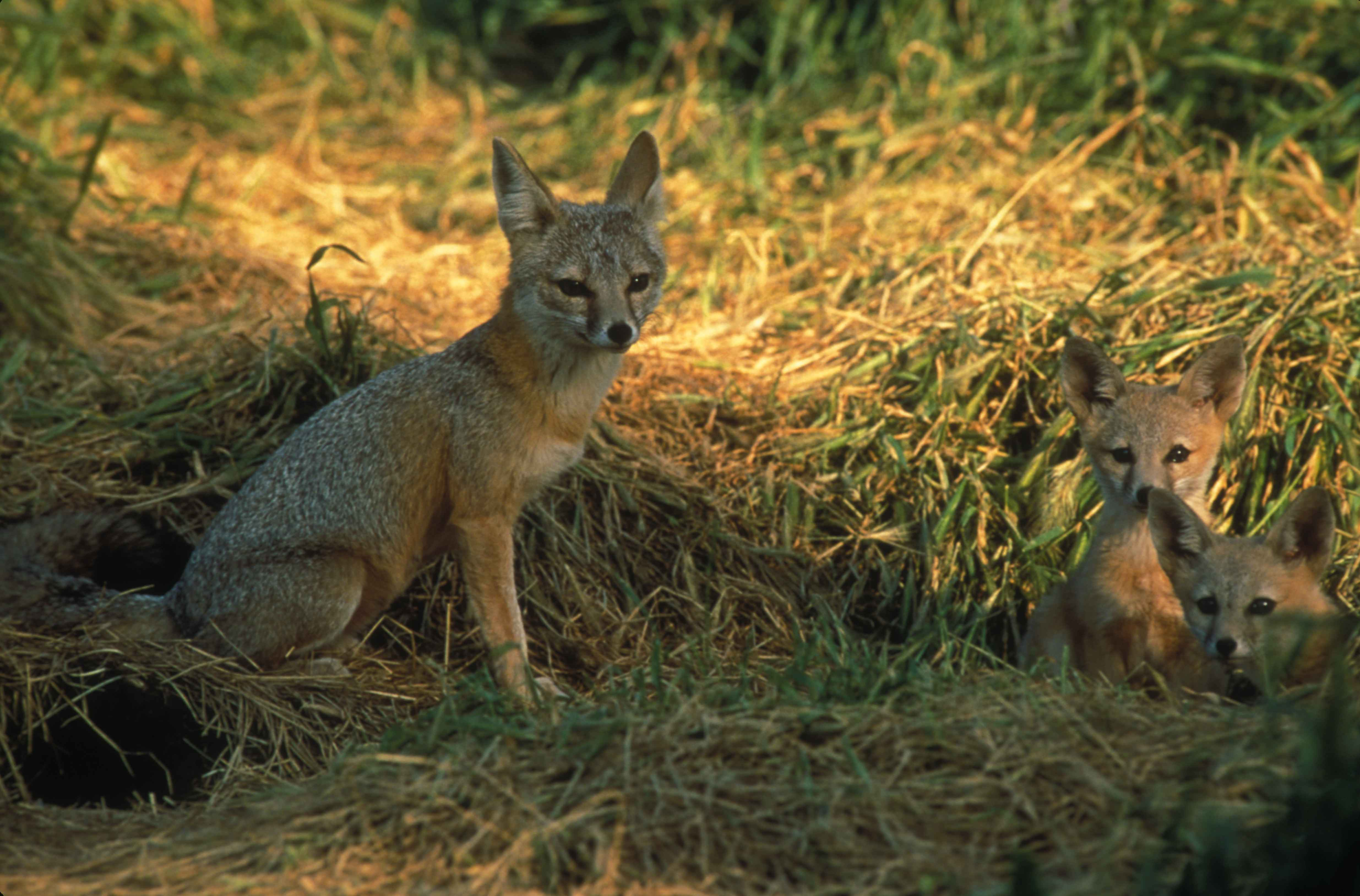
A San Joaquin kit fox family

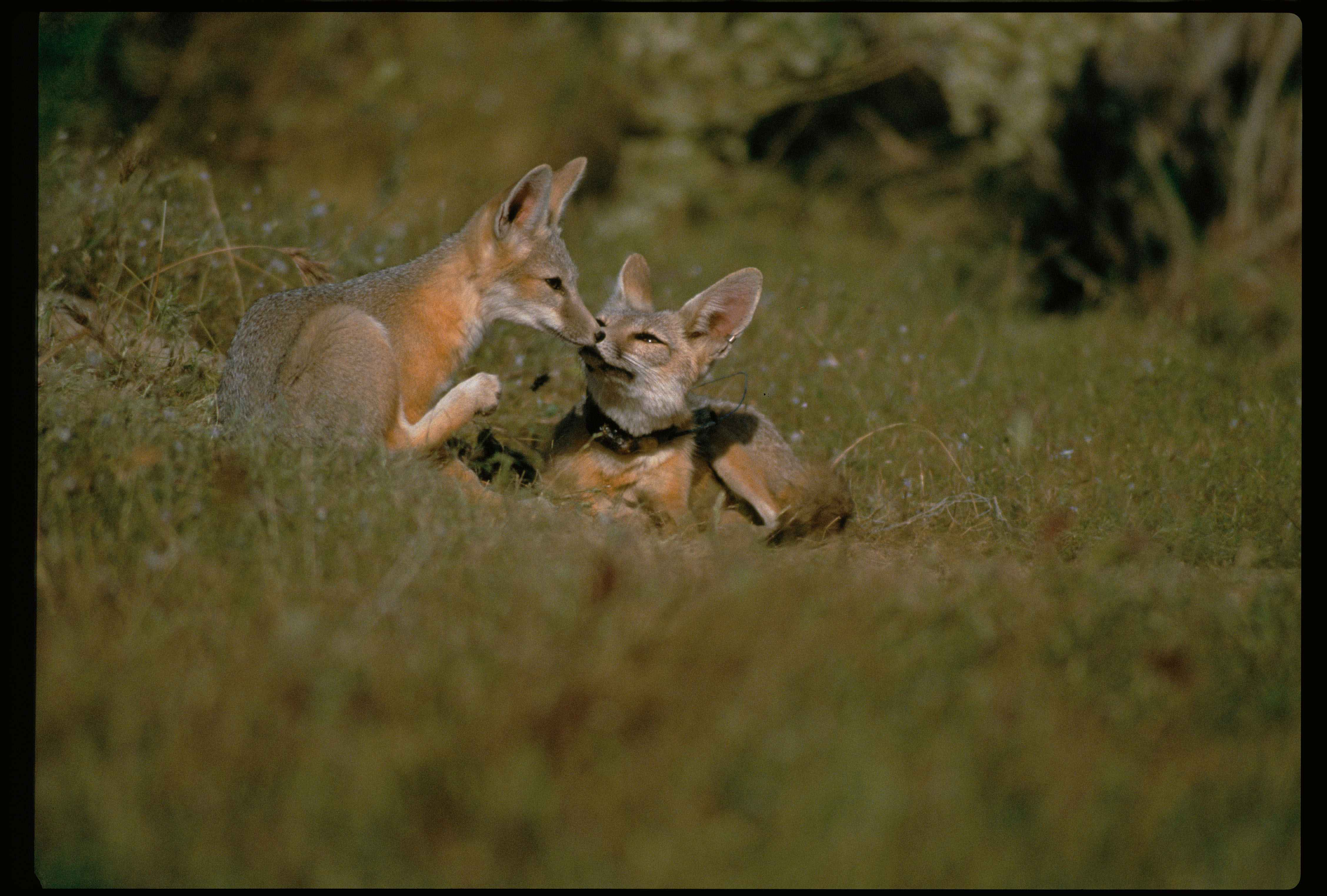
Two San Joaquin kit foxes

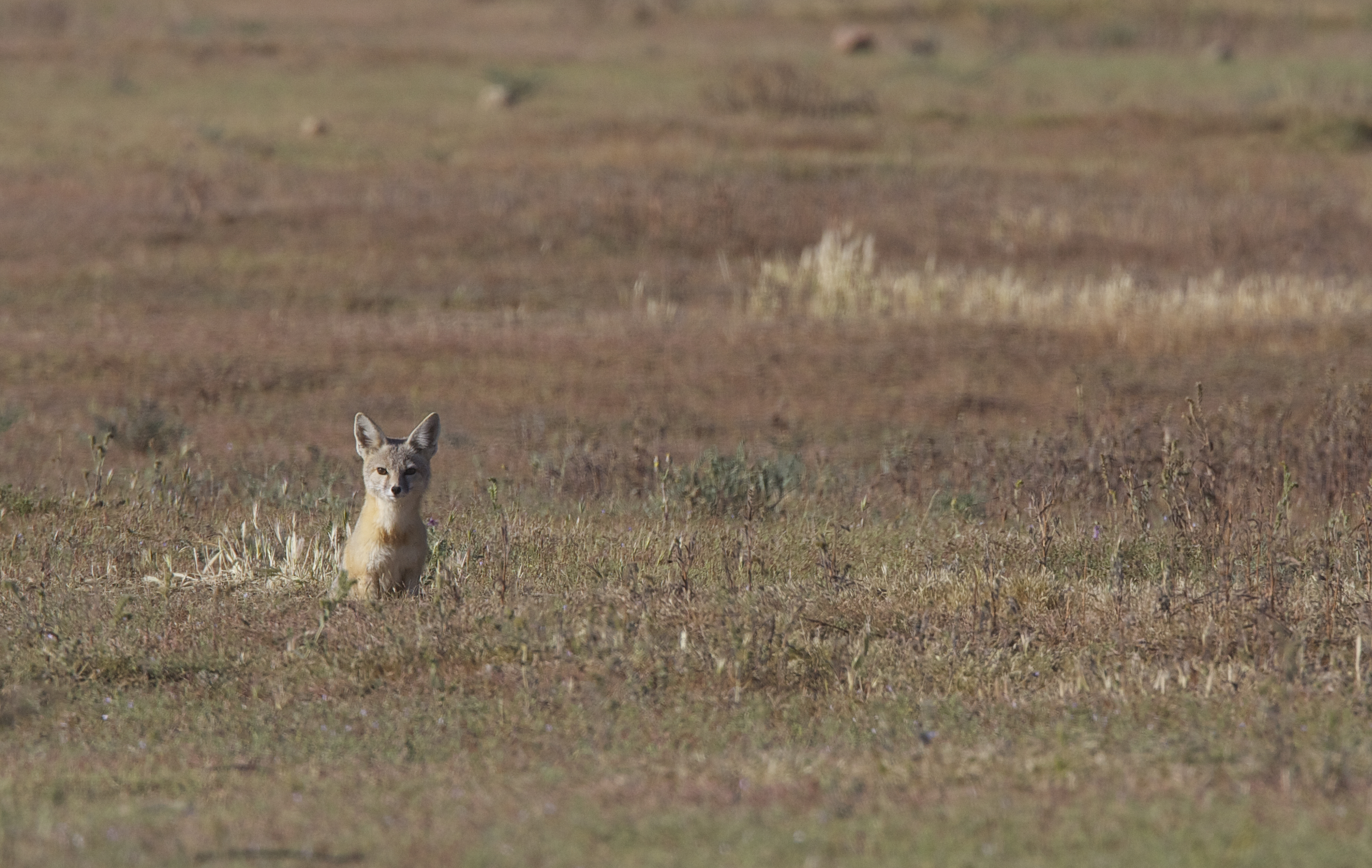
V. m. mutica at Carrizo Plains National Monument
