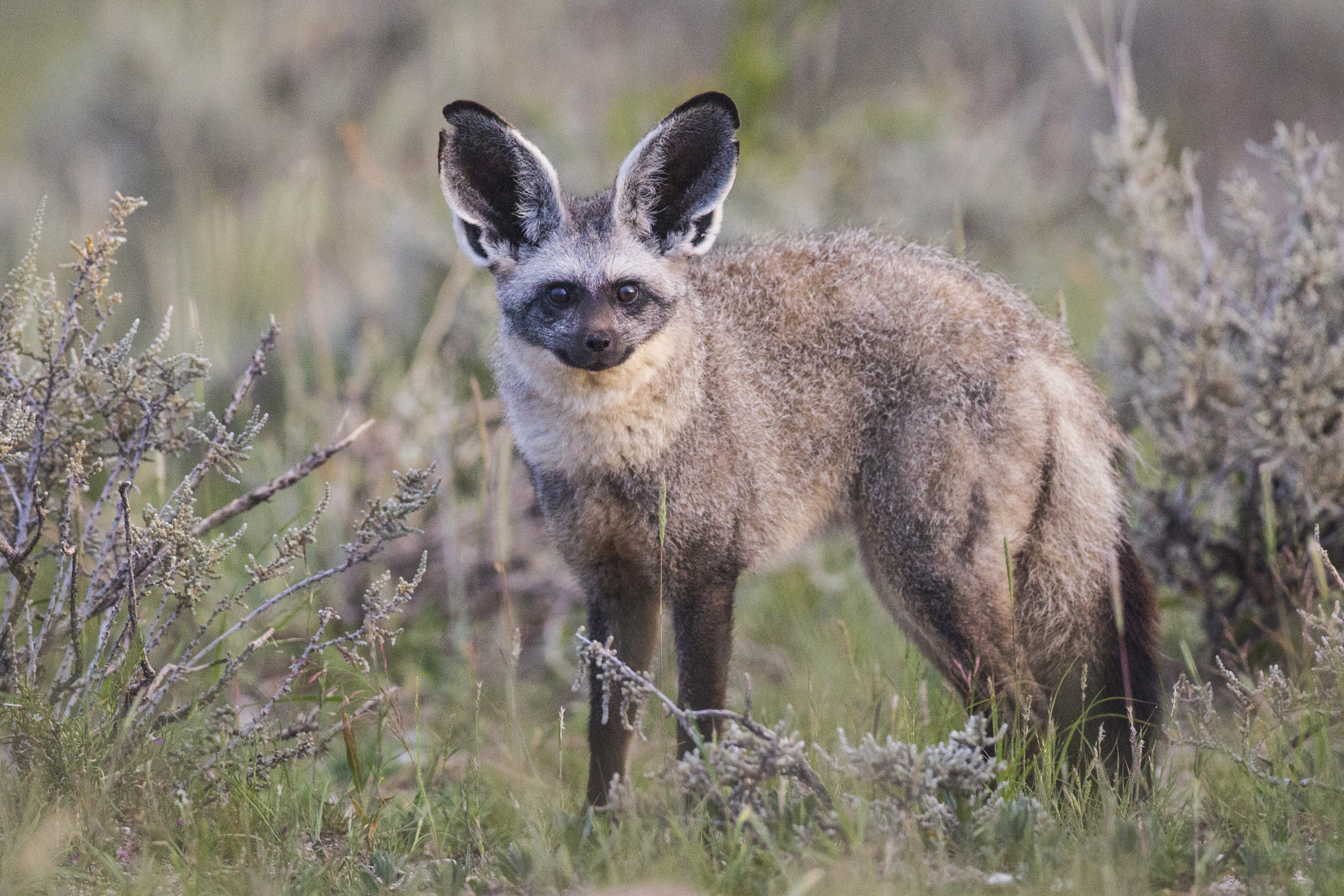

Conservation status
- Least Concern (IUCN 3.1)

Scientific classification
- Kingdom: Animalia
- Phylum: Chordata
- Class: Mammalia
- Order: Carnivora
- Family: Canidae
- Subfamily: Caninae
- Genus: Otocyon; S. Müller, 1835
- Species: O. megalotis

Binomial name
- Otocyon megalotis (Desmarest, 1822)

Subspecies
- O. megalotis megalotis; O. megalotis virgatus
- O. m. megalotis range O. m. virgatus range

Synonyms
- Canis megalotis Desmarest, 1822; Canis lalandii Desmoulins, 1823; Otocyon caffer S. Müller, 1836; Agriodus auritus H. Smith, 1840; Otocyon virgatus Miller, 1909; Otocyon canescens Cabrera, 1910; Otocyon steinhardti Zukowsky, 1924

= Bat-eared fox =

Bat-eared fox Temporal range: Chibanian–Recent 0.3–0 Ma

Species of carnivorous mammal

The bat-eared fox (Otocyon megalotis) is a species of fox found on the African savanna. It is the only extant species of the genus Otocyon, and is the sister species to all other members of the tribe Vulpini, not genetically being a true fox. Fossil records indicate this canid first appeared during the middle Pleistocene. There are two separate populations of the bat-eared fox, each of which makes up a subspecies. The bat referred to in its colloquial name is possibly the Egyptian slit-faced bat (Nycteris thebaica), which is abundant in the region and has very large ears. Other vernacular names include big-eared fox, black-eared fox, long-eared fox, Delalande's fox, cape fox, and motlosi.

It is named for its large ears, which have a role in thermoregulation. It is a small canid, being of comparable size to the closely related cape fox and common raccoon dog. Its fur varies in color depending on the subspecies, but is generally tan-colored and has guard hairs of a grey agouti color. The bat-eared fox is found in Southern and East Africa, though the two subspecies are separated by an unpopulated region spanning approximately 1,000 km (620 mi). In its range, the bat-eared fox digs dens for shelter and to raise its young, and lives in social groups or pairs that hunt and groom together.

The bat-eared fox eats mainly insects—a diet unique among canids. It forages in arid and semi-arid environments, preferring regions with bare ground and where ungulates keep grasses short, and locates prey by using its hearing, walking slowly with its nose to the ground and ears tilted forwards. Most of its diet is made up of harvester termites, which also hydrates the bat-eared fox, as it does not drink from free-standing water. By feeding on harvester termites, it acts as a means of population control for these insects, which are considered pests in regions populated by humans. In such regions, it has been hunted for its fur. No major threats to the bat-eared fox exist, and as such it is considered to be a least-concern species.

== Etymology ==
The bat-eared fox's generic name Otocyon is derived from the Greek words otus (οὖς) for ear and cyon (κύων) for dog, while the specific name megalotis comes from the Greek words megas (μέγας) for large and otus (οὖς) for ear. The common name for the bat-eared fox is likely taken from the Egyptian slit-faced bat (Nycteris thebaica), due to the bat's similarly large ears and abundance in the bat-eared fox's geographic range. Other vernacular (common) names for the bat-eared fox include big-eared fox, black-eared fox, long-eared fox, Delalande's fox, cape fox, (Note: Note that cape fox is the common name for a true fox from South Africa, Vulpes chama.) and motlosi.

== Taxonomy and evolution ==
The bat-eared fox is the only living species of the genus Otocyon. Its scientific name, given by Anselme Gaëtan Desmarest, was initially Canis megalotis (due to its close resemblance to jackals), and later changed by Salomon Müller which placed it in its own genus, Otocyon; its large ears and different dental formula warrant inclusion in a genus distinct from both Canis and true foxes (Vulpes).

Due to its unusual dentition—3.1.4.3-43.1.4.4-5 × 2 = 46-50, the largest number of teeth known in any non-marsupial land mammal—the bat-eared fox was previously placed in a distinct subfamily of canids, Otocyoninae, as no relationship to any living species of canid could be established.

=== Phylogeny ===
Otocyon megalotis is regarded as having affinities with the vulpine line, and Otocyon was placed with high confidence as sister to the clade containing both the raccoon dog (Nyctereutes) and true foxes (Vulpes).

The following cladogram is based on figures by Lindblad-Toh et al., 2005:

Canidae

- Canidae
  - - - - Vulpes
        - Nyctereutes
      - Otocyon
    - - Cerdocyonina
      - Canina
  - Urocyon

==== Subspecies ====
Currently, there are two recognized subspecies:

Image	Subspecies	Distribution
A fox standing in a neutral position	Otocyon megalotis megalotis (Desmarest, 1822)	Southern Africa
A fox with its mouth slightly open	Otocyon megalotis virgatus (Cabrera, 1910)	East Africa

==== Fossils ====
Otocyon is poorly represented in the fossil record. It is suggested the genus forms a clade with Prototocyon, an extinct genus of canid. In the Olduvai Gorge, Tanzania, fossils of the related extinct fox species first considered Otocyon recki have been found that date back to the late Pliocene or early Pleistocene. O. recki is now often placed in Prototocyon; fossil records specifically of Otocyon megalotis have been identified in sediments only as old as the middle Pleistocene. These fossils, known from the Lainyamok locality of Kenya, date back 0.3 million years.

== Description ==
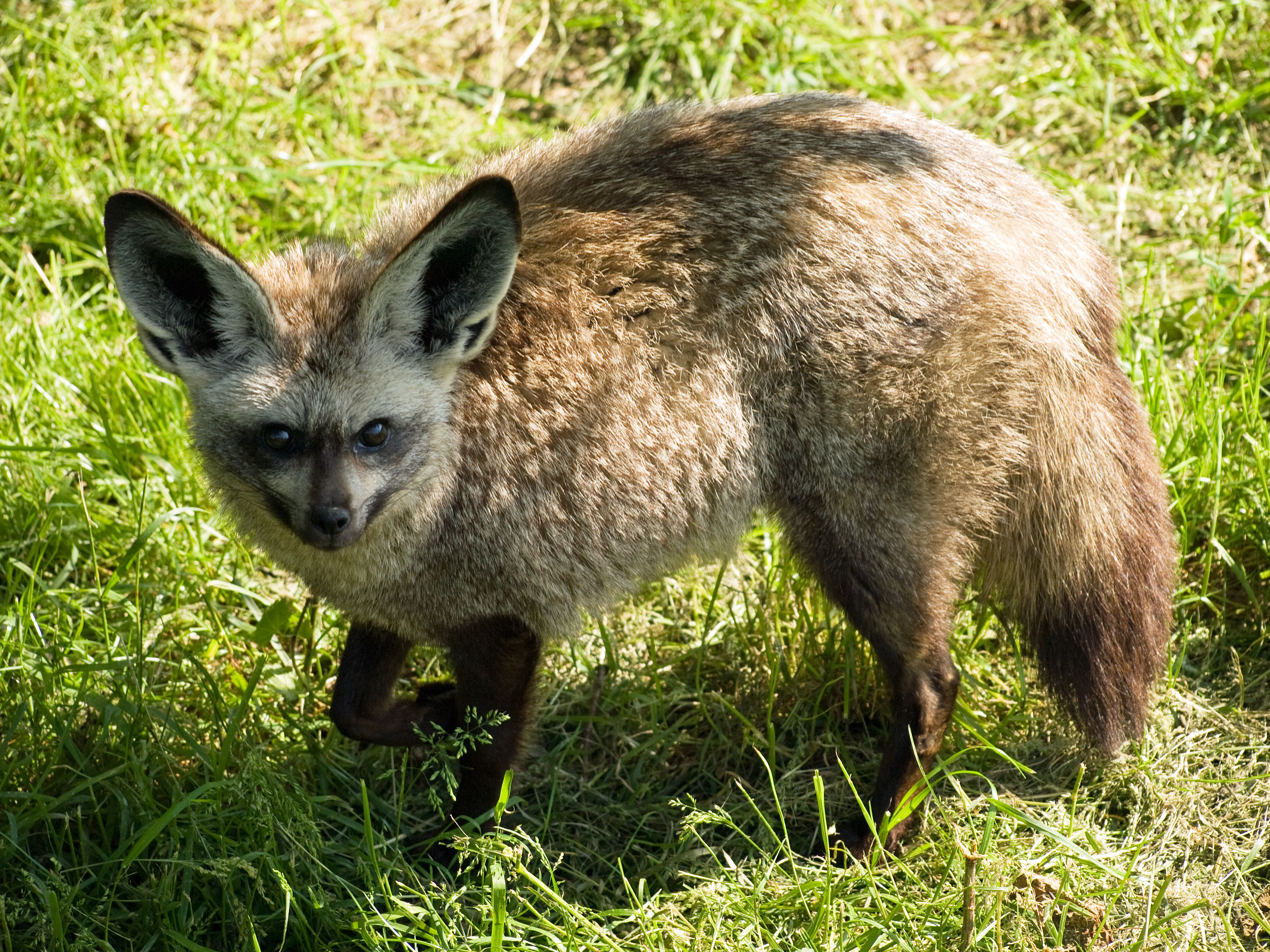
An adult bat-eared fox

Bat-eared foxes range in weight from 3 to 5.3 kg (6.6 to 11.7 lb). Their head and body length is 46–66 cm (18–26 in), tail length is 23–34 cm (9.1–13 in), shoulder height is 30–40 cm (12–16 in), and the notably large ears are 11–13 cm (4.3–5.1 in) long. The species displays a degree of sexual dimorphism, in that females are generally larger and heavier than males.

Generally, the pelage is tan-colored, with gray guard hairs of an agouti coloration. The undersides and throat are pale. The limbs are dark, shading to dark brown or black at their extremities. The muzzle, the tip and upperside of the tail and the facial mask are black. The insides of the ears are white. Individuals of the East African subspecies, O. m. virgatus, tend toward a buff pelage with dark brown markings, as opposed to the black of O. m. megalotis. The proportionally large ears of bat-eared foxes, a characteristic shared by many other inhabitants of hot, arid climates, such as the desert cottontail, help to distribute heat. They also help in locating prey.

=== Dentition and jaw adaptations ===
The teeth of the bat-eared fox are much smaller those of other canid species, excepting the bush dog (Spetothos venaticus) and dhole (Cuon alpinus). The molars are much more blunted and the roots are stronger than those of other canids, and the teeth have less shearing capability. These are adaptations to its insectivorous diet and avoidance of soft foods. The bat-eared fox possesses 4-5 lower molar teeth and 3-4 upper molars, a number notable as it is greater than the number of lower or upper molars possessed by any other extant eutherian (Note: Excepting the odontocetes.) or canid, respectively.

The teeth are not the bat-eared fox's only morphological adaptation for its diet. On the lower jaw, a step-like protrusion is present called the subangular process, which is present in only a few canid species and both increases the bite force of the masseter muscle and anchors the large digastric muscle to allow for rapid chewing. The digastric muscle is also modified to allow for opening and closing the jaw five times per second.

== Distribution and habitat ==
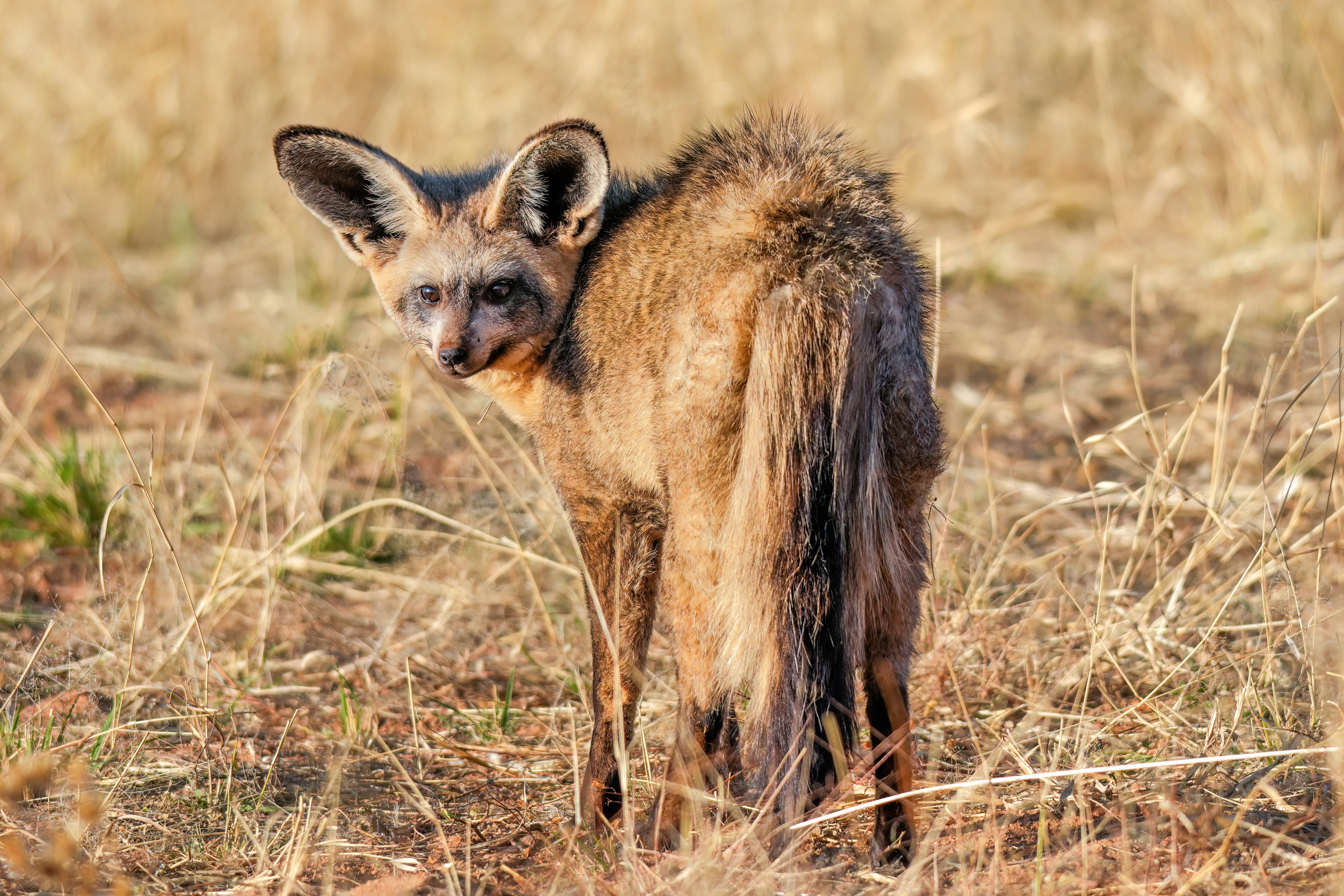
Bat-eared fox in Otjozondjupa Region, Namibia

The bat-eared fox has a disjunct distribution across the arid and semi-arid regions of Eastern and Southern Africa, in two allopatric populations (representing each of the recognized subspecies) separated by approximately 1,000 km (620 mi). Subspecies O. m. virgatus extends from southern Sudan, Ethiopia and Somalia, through Uganda and Kenya to southwestern Tanzania; O. m. megalotis occurs in the southern part of Africa, ranging from Angola through Namibia and Botswana to South Africa, and extends as far east as Mozambique and Zimbabwe, spreading into the Cape Peninsula and toward Cape Agulhas. Home ranges vary in size from 0.3 to 3.5 km^{2} (0.12 to 1.35 sq mi). The two disjunct ranges of O. megalotis were likely connected to each other during the Pleistocene epoch.

Bat-eared foxes are adapted to arid or semi-arid environments. They are commonly found in short grasslands, as well as the more arid regions of the savannas, along woodland edges, and in open acacia woodlands. They prefer bare ground and areas where grass is kept short by grazing ungulates and tend to hunt in these short grass and low shrub habitats. However, they do venture into areas with tall grasses and thick shrubs to hide when threatened.

In addition to raising their young in dens, bat-eared foxes use self-dug dens for shelter from extreme temperatures and winds. They also lie under acacia trees in South Africa to seek shade during the day.

== Behavior and ecology ==
Bat-eared foxes are social animals. They live in pairs or groups, depending on the subspecies. In southern Africa (ssp. megalotis), bat-eared foxes live in monogamous pairs with pups, while those in eastern Africa (ssp. virgatus) may live in pairs, or in stable family groups consisting of a male and up to three closely related females with pups. Individuals forage, play, and rest together in a group, which helps in protection against predators. They engage in frequent and extended allogrooming sessions, which serve to strengthen group cohesion, mostly between mature adults, but also between young adults and mature adults.

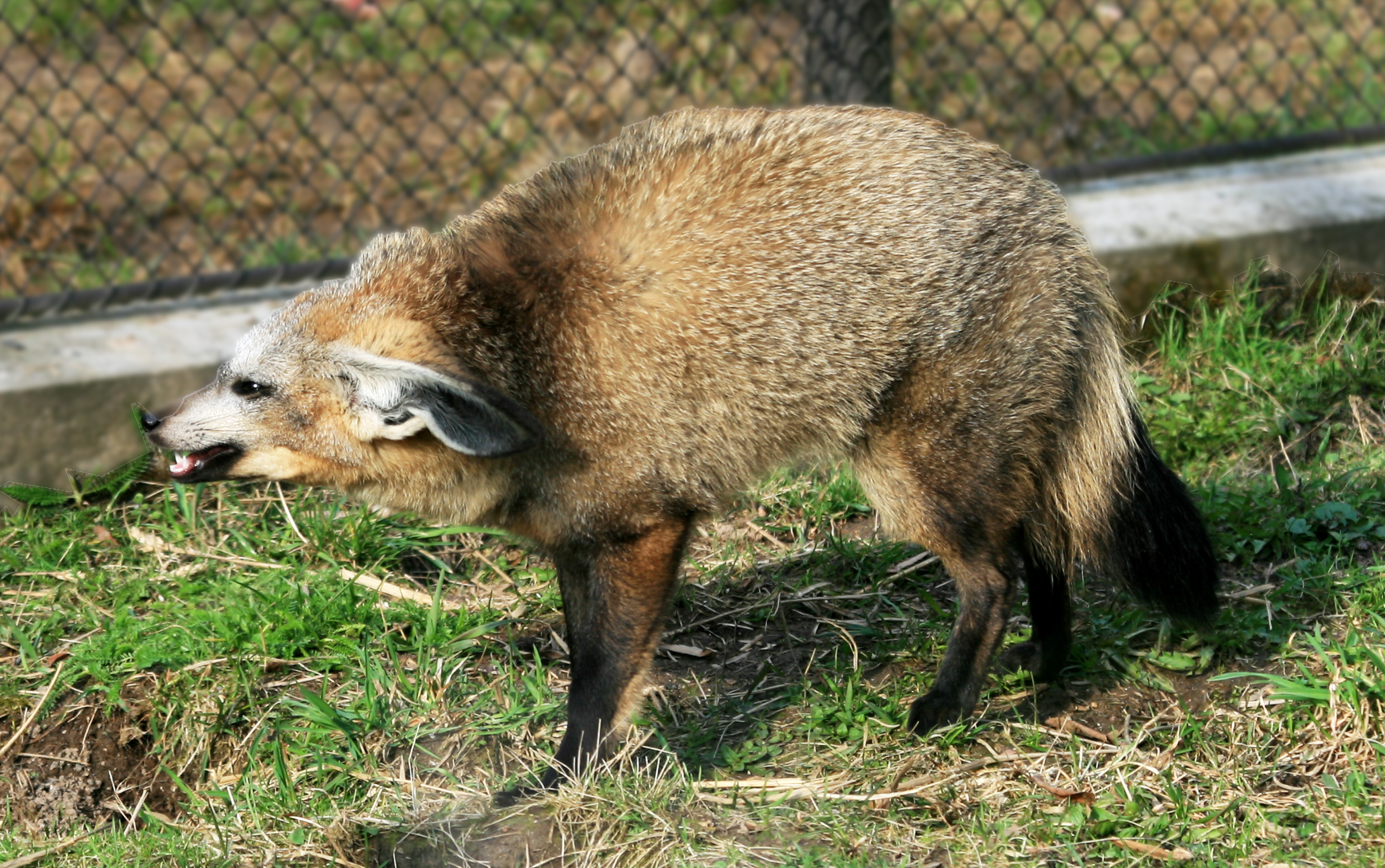
Threat display of bat-eared fox

Visual displays are important in communication among bat-eared foxes. When they are looking intently at something, the head is held high, eyes are open, ears are erect and facing forward, and the mouth is closed. When an individual is in threat or showing submission, the ears are pulled back and lying against the head and the head is low. The tail also plays a role in communication. When an individual is asserting dominance or aggression, feeling threatened, playing, or being sexually aroused, the tail is arched in an inverted U shape. Individuals can also use piloerection, which occurs when individual hairs are standing straight, to make it appear larger when faced with extreme threat. When running, chasing, or fleeing, the tail is straight and horizontal. The bat-eared fox can recognize individuals up to 30 m (98 ft) away. The recognition process has three steps: First they ignore the individual, then they stare intently, and finally they either approach or attack without displays. When greeting another, the approaching individual shows symbolic submission which is received by the other individual with a high head and tail down. Few vocalizations are used for communication, but contact calls and warning calls are used, mostly during the winter. Glandular secretions and scratching, other than for digging, are absent in communication, although they appear to establish pair bonds by scent marking.

In the more northern areas of its range (around Serengeti), they are nocturnal 85% of the time. However, around South Africa, they are nocturnal only in the summer and diurnal during the winter.

=== Hunting and diet ===
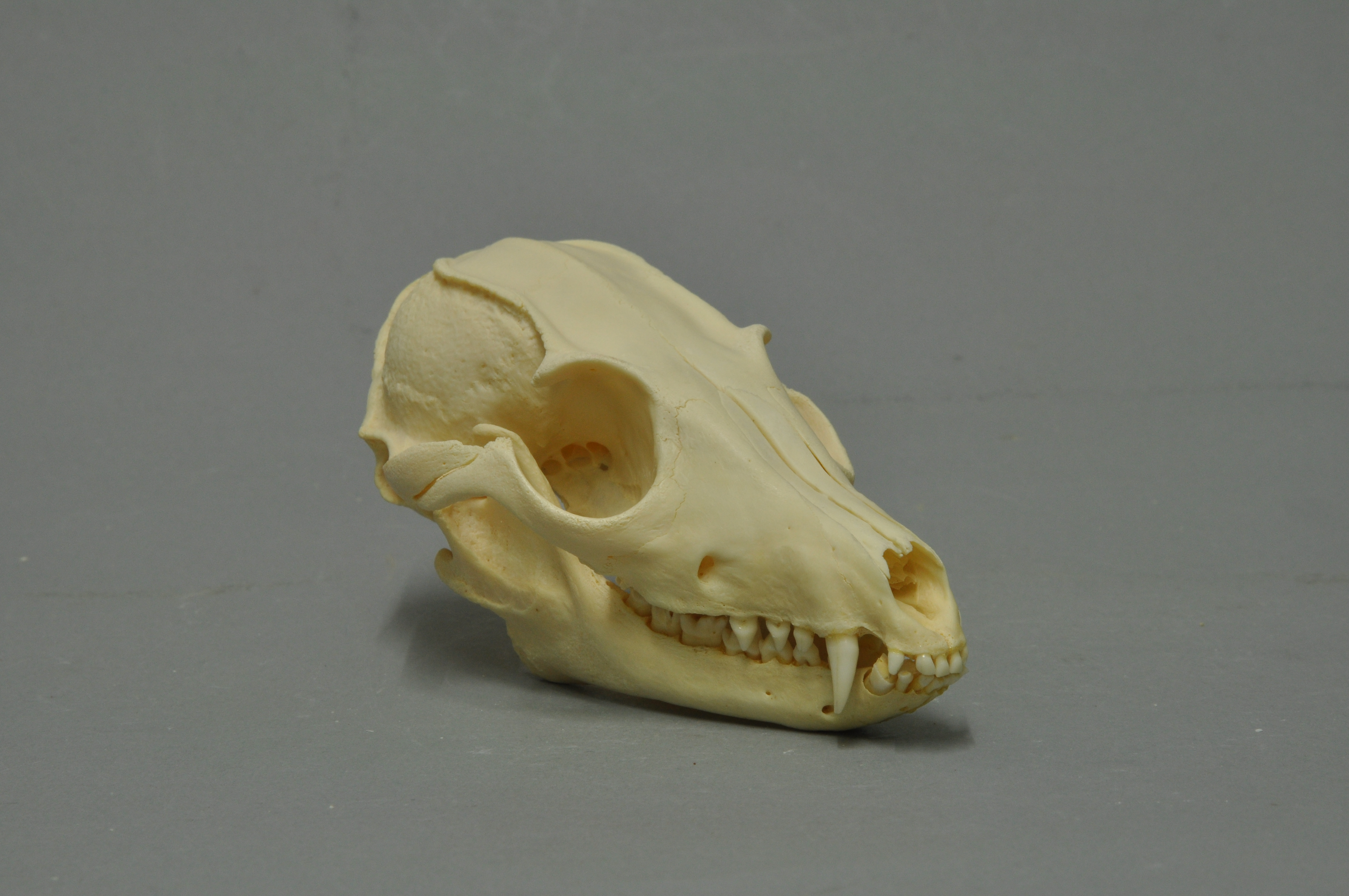
Skull of a bat-eared fox

The bat-eared fox is the only truly insectivorous canid, with a marked preference for harvester termites (Hodotermes mossambicus), which can constitute 80–90% of its diet.

When this particular species of termite is not available, their opportunistic diet allows a wide variety of food items to be taken: they can consume other species of termites, other arthropods such as ants, beetles (especially scarab beetles (dung beetles)), crickets, grasshoppers, millipedes, moths, scorpions, spiders, and rarely birds, birds' eggs and chicks, small mammals (rodents), reptiles, and fungi (the desert truffle Kalaharituber pfeilii). Berries, seeds, and wild fruit also are consumed. The bat-eared fox refuses to feed on snouted harvester termites, likely because it is not adapted to tolerate the termites' chemical defense.

Bat-eared foxes require water for lactation, but have not been observed drinking from free-standing water. They meet their water requirements through the high water content of their diet.

Bat-eared foxes usually hunt in groups, often splitting up in pairs, with separated subgroups moving through the same general area. When termites are plentiful, feeding aggregations of up to 15 individuals from different families occur. Individuals forage alone after family groups break in June or July and during the months after pups birth.

Prey is located primarily by auditory means, rather than by smell or sight. Foraging patterns vary between seasons and populations, and coincide with termite availability. In eastern Africa, nocturnal foraging is the rule, while in southern Africa, nocturnal foraging during summer slowly changes to an almost solely diurnal pattern during the winter. Foraging techniques depend on prey type, but food is often located by walking slowly, nose close to the ground and ears tilted forward. It usually occurs in patches, which match the clumped prey resources, such as termite colonies, that also occur in patches. Groups are able to forage on clumps of prey in patches because they do not fight each other for food due to their degree of sociality and lack of territoriality. As the bat-eared fox's range overlaps with that of the aardvark, it will take advantage of termite mounds opened up by the latter animal, as will aardwolves.

=== Reproduction and life cycle ===
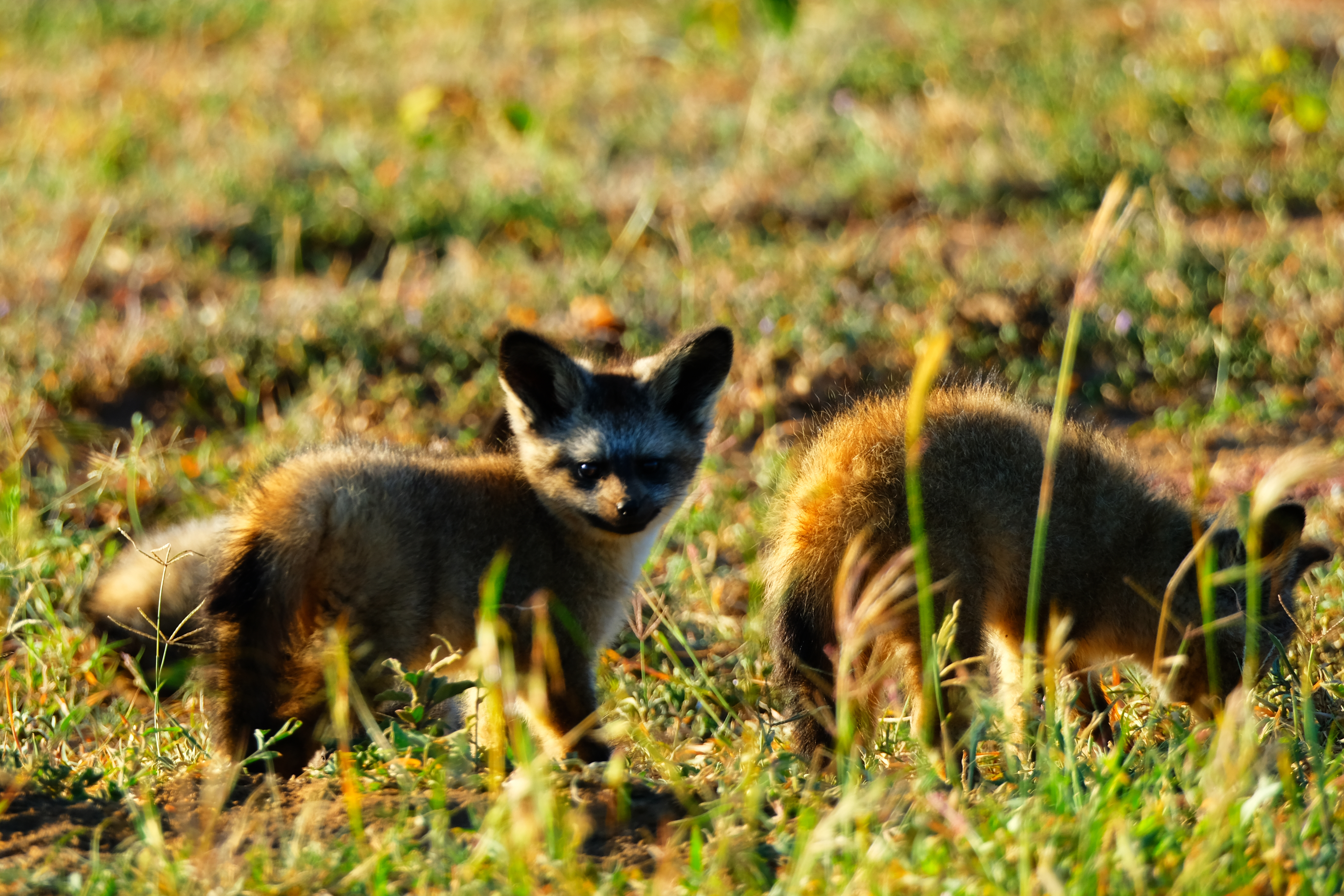
Juvenile bat-eared foxes playing outside of their den in Naboisho Conservancy, Kenya, just outside of Maasai Mara National Reserve

The bat-eared fox is predominantly socially monogamous, although it has been observed in polygynous groups. In contrast to other canids, the bat-eared fox has a reversal in parental roles, with the male taking on the majority of the parental care behavior. Gestation lasts for 60–70 days and females give birth to litters consisting of one to six pups. Beyond lactation, which lasts 14 to 15 weeks, males take over grooming, defending, huddling, chaperoning, and carrying the young between den sites. Additionally, male care and den attendance rates have been shown to have a direct correlation with pup survival rates. The female forages for food, which she uses to maintain milk production, on which the pups heavily depend. Food foraged by the female is not brought back to the pups or regurgitated to feed the pups.

Pups in the Kalahari region are born September–November and those in the Botswana region are born October–December. Young bat-eared foxes disperse and leave their family groups at 5–6 months old and reach sexual maturity at 8–9 months. Bat-eared foxes have been recorded reaching maximum lifespans of over 14 to 17 years in captivity, and up to 9 years in the wild.

== Threats and human interaction ==
No major threats to bat-eared fox populations exist, though hunting, disease and drought can threaten individuals and lower population numbers on a short term scale. Diseases that affect the bat-eared fox include canine distemper, canine parvovirus, and rabies. Predators to the bat-eared fox are mostly large mammalian carnivores, but they are also prey to large raptors and the Central African rock python. Black-backed jackals pose the greatest threat to young bat-eared foxes, but in breeding areas, adults will engage in mobbing behavior to drive them off.

=== Conservation ===
Otocyon megalotis is considered to be a least-concern species by both the International Union for Conservation of Nature and the South African National Biodiversity Institute. Some parts of its range are incidentally protected areas.

=== Human use and captivity ===
The bat-eared fox has some commercial use for humans. They are important for harvester termite population control, as the termites are considered pests. They have also been hunted for their fur by Botswana natives. Captive bat-eared foxes are present in zoos in North America, South Africa, Europe, and Asia.
