= Prototocyon =

Prototocyon Temporal range: Late Pliocene-Early Pleistocene

Scientific classification
- Kingdom: Animalia
- Phylum: Chordata
- Class: Mammalia
- Order: Carnivora
- Family: Canidae
- Genus: †Prototocyon; Pohle, 1928

Type species
- †Prototocyon curvipalatus Bose, 1880

Species
- P. curvipalatus; P. recki

Synonyms
- Sivacyon

Extinct genus of carnivores

Prototocyon is an extinct genus of small omnivorous canid that lived during the Late Pliocene and Early Pleistocene. It is closely related to the living bat-eared fox (Otocyon).

== Taxonomy ==
Prototocyon was named by Pohle (1928) and was assigned to Canidae by Carroll (1988). Old literature relates it to Vulpes bengalensis, but not more modern literature (e.g. McKenna and Bell. A 2013 study stated that the genus "is only doubtfully distinct from Otocyon" the genus of the living bat-eared fox.

== Description ==
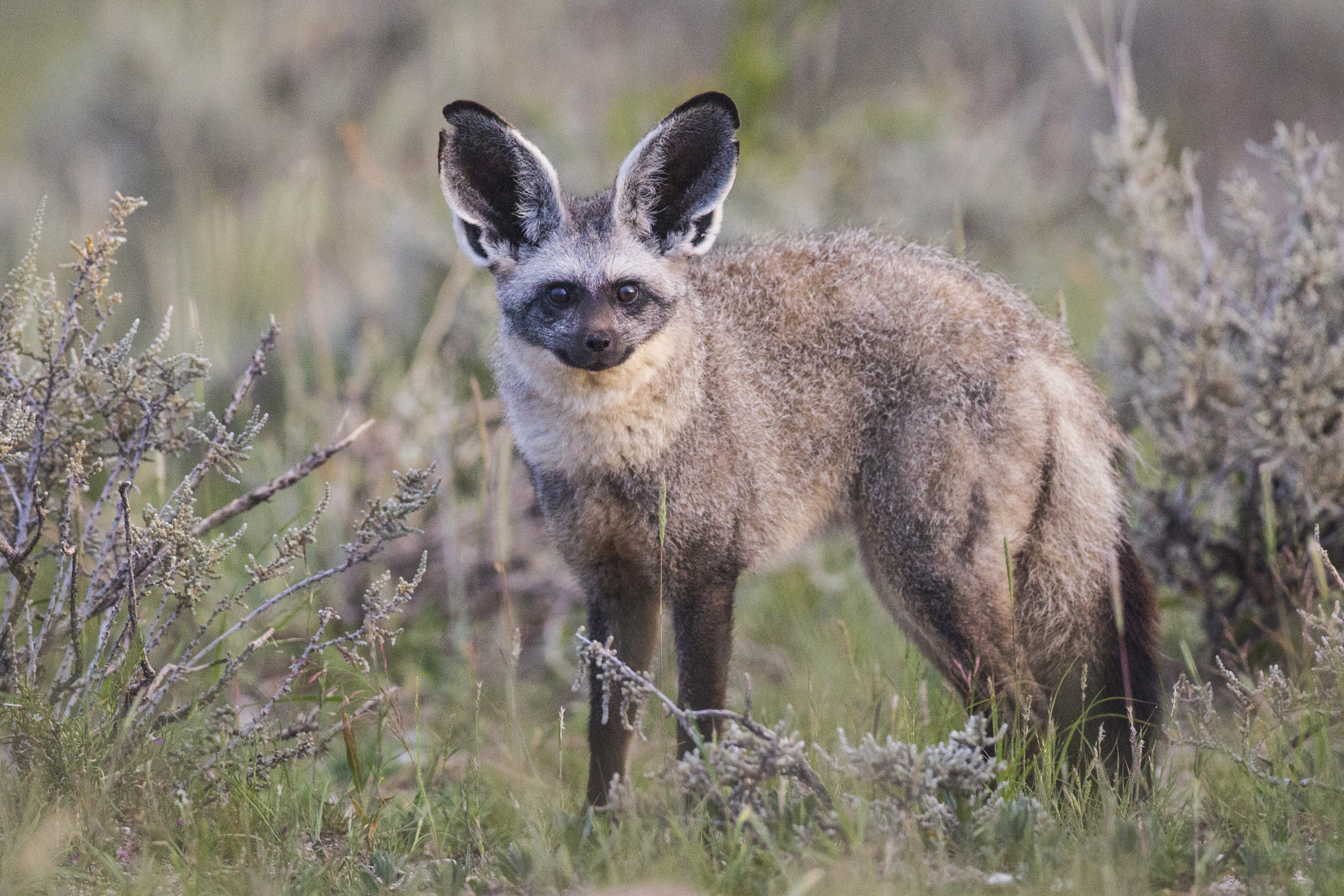
Prototocyon is closely related and likely looked similar to the living bat-eared fox

Prototocyon was a small canine similar to the bat-eared fox in overall morphology and likely in habits as well. It differed from the modern bat-eared fox mainly in its more primitive dentition.

== Fossil distribution ==
Fossil remains of P. curvipalatus were recovered from the early Pleistocene Upper Siwaliks horizon of the Siwalik Hills, India (Colbert 1935; Pilgrim 1932).

Fossils of P recki have been found in the Olduvai Gorge area of Tanzania.
