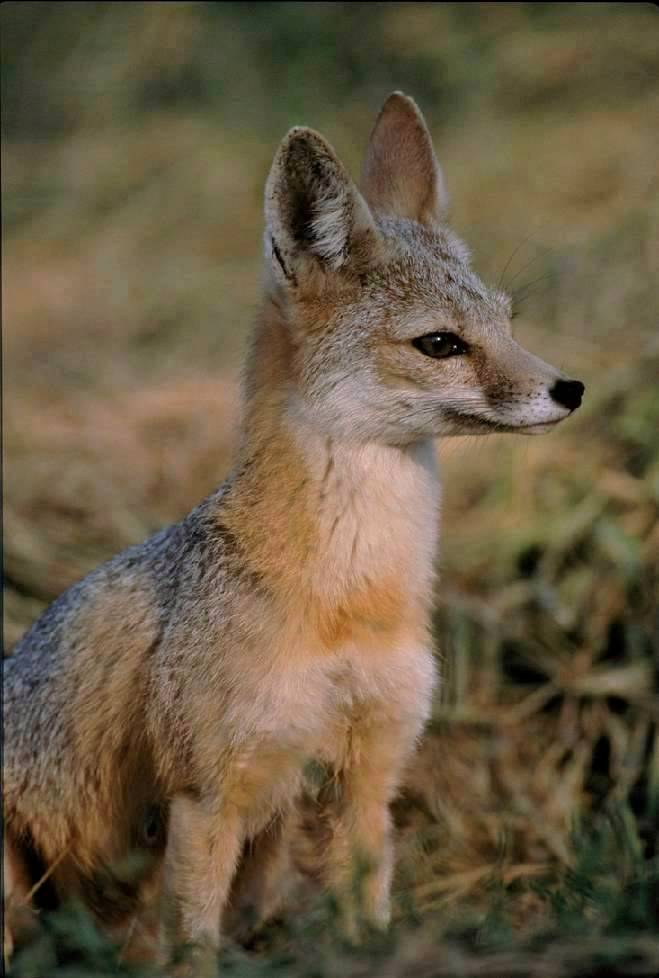
- San Joaquin kit fox sitting

Conservation status
- Least Concern (IUCN 3.1)

Scientific classification
- Kingdom: Animalia
- Phylum: Chordata
- Class: Mammalia
- Order: Carnivora
- Family: Canidae
- Genus: Vulpes
- Species: V. macrotis

Binomial name
- Vulpes macrotis Merriam, 1888

Subspecies
- †V. m. macrotis V. m. mutica
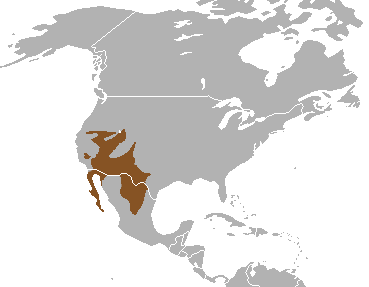
- distribution

Synonyms
- Vulpes muticus Merriam, 1902; Vulpes neomexicanus Merriam, 1903; Vulpes arsipus Elliot, 1904; Vulpes devius Nelson and Goldman, 1909; Vulpes arizonensis Goldman, 1931; Vulpes nevadensis Goldman, 1931; Vulpes tenuirostris Nelson and Goldman, 1931; Vulpes zinseri Benson, 1938

= Kit fox =

Species of North American fox

The kit fox (Vulpes macrotis) is a fox species that inhabits arid and semi-arid regions of the Southwestern United States and northern and central Mexico. They are the smallest of the four species of Vulpes occurring in North America and are among the smallest of the vulpini taxon.

== Taxonomy ==
Some mammalogists classify it as conspecific with the swift fox, V. velox, but molecular systematics indicate that the two species are distinct. Interbreeding between the two species does occur where their ranges overlap (for example, in eastern New Mexico and western Texas), but this hybridization is quite restricted in scope.

Subspecific designations for the species are not fully addressed. As many as eight subspecies have been recognized, although further analyses have not found support for any subspecies differentiation. Available data suggests that kit foxes in the San Joaquin Valley of California are likely to warrant a subspecific designation, V. m. mutica, due to geographical isolation, and that any other kit foxes may be included in a second subspecies, V. m. macrotis. Kit fox is one of 12 extant Vulpes species and a member of the family Canidae. The cladogram below is based on the phylogeny of Lindblad-Toh (2005) modified to incorporate recent findings on Vulpes.

Kit fox within Vulpes
- Vulpes
  - - Vulpes zerda (Fennec fox)
    - Vulpes cana (Blanford's fox)
  - - Vulpes chama (Cape fox)
    - - - - Vulpes vulpes (Red fox)
          - Vulpes rueppellii (Rüppell's fox)
        - - Vulpes corsac (Corsac fox)
          - Vulpes ferrilata (Tibetan fox)
      - - Vulpes macrotis (Kit fox)
        - Vulpes lagopus (Arctic fox)

=== Subspecies ===
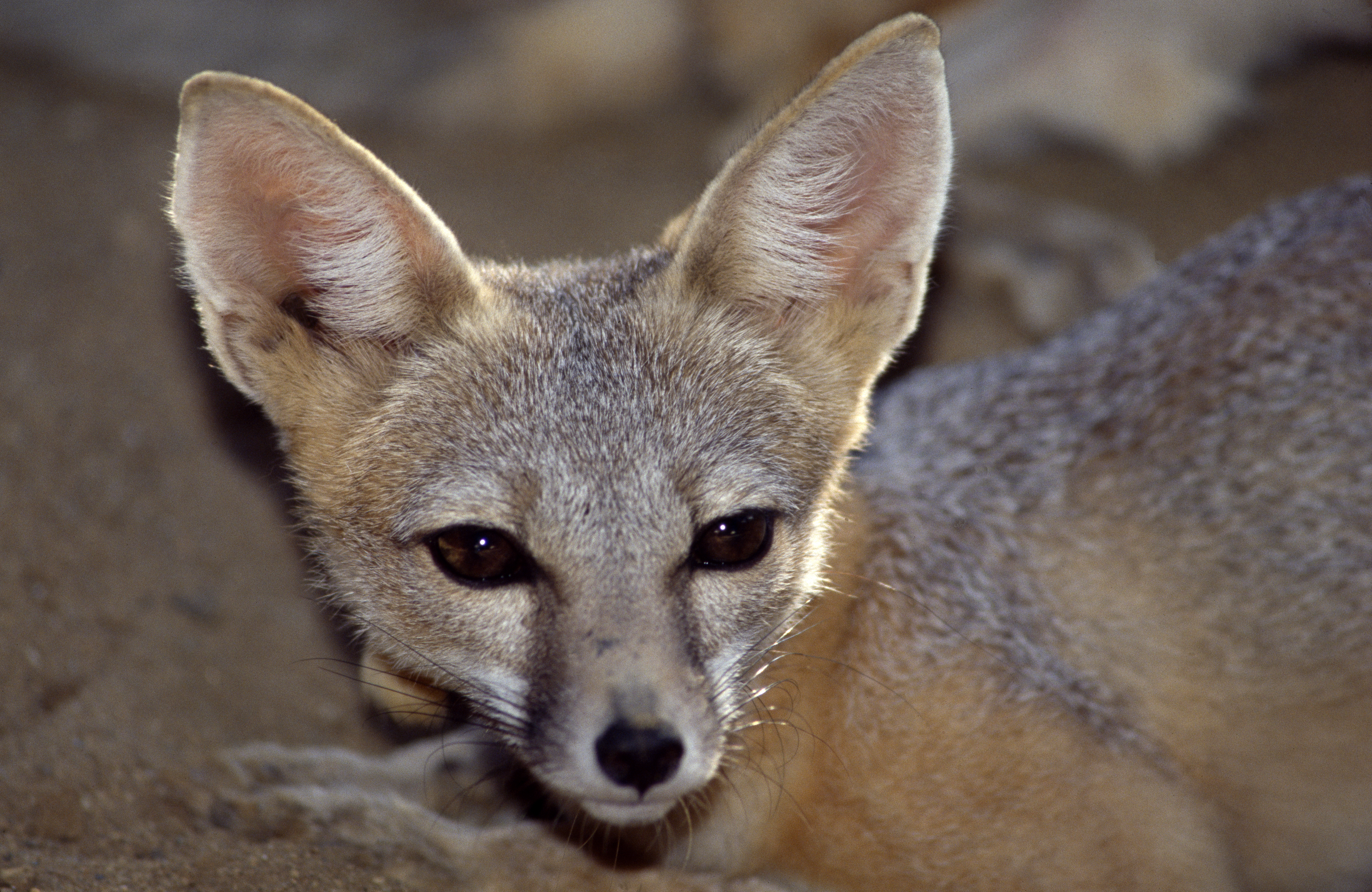
San Joaquin kit fox at the California Living Museum in Bakersfield

The endangered San Joaquin kit fox (Vulpes macrotis mutica) was formerly very common in the San Joaquin Valley and through much of Central California. Its 1990 population was estimated to be 7,000. Although a more updated number is not readily available, several projects are currently looking into spatial tracking of kit fox populations across several regions of California. This subspecies is still endangered, after nearly 50 years of being on the Endangered Species List. Officially, this subspecies was listed on March 3, 1967. On September 26, 2007, Wildlands Inc. announced the designation of the 684 acre (277 ha) Deadman Creek Conservation Bank as the protective habitat of the San Joaquin kit fox. However, the population continues to decline mostly due to heavy habitat loss. Other factors contributing to the decline include interspecific competition with red foxes and changes in predator competition. The decline of wolves in California may also have affected predator relationships by allowing coyotes to become more dominant in kit fox habitats.

== Appearance ==
The kit fox is one of the smallest species of the family Canidae in North America. This species exhibits little sexual dimorphism, with the male being slightly larger. The average weight of the kit fox is between 1.6 and 2.7 kg (3.5 and 6.0 lb). The body length is 455 to 535 mm (17.9 to 21.1 in), with a tail that is about 40% of its total length, adding another 260–323 mm (10.2–12.7 in). Its ears measure 71 and 95 mm (2.8 and 3.7 in), and help dissipate heat while providing exceptional hearing, much like those of the fennec fox.

The color and texture of the coat vary geographically. Its color ranges from yellow to gray, and the back is usually darker than the majority of its coat; its belly and inner ears are usually lighter, while there are distinct dark patches around the nose. The grizzled texture of the coat results from guard hairs that are typically black-tipped or contain two black bands that are separated by a white band. The guard hairs are less than 50 millimetres (2.0 in) long, and particularly prominent in the middle of the back. The soles of the legs are protected by stiff tufts of hair, a trait that improves traction on sandy surfaces, and provides protection against extreme temperatures. Muzzles and vibrissae are generally black to brown. The tail of the fox is bushy and gray, with a black tip, and the caudal gland has a pronounced black spot. Unlike the gray fox, it has no stripe along the length of its tail. The ears are tan or gray on the back, turning to buff or orange at the base. The shoulders, the lower sides, the flanks, and the strip about 25 mm wide across the chest range in color from buffy to orange.

== Distribution and habitat ==
The northernmost part of the species' range is the arid interior of Oregon. Its eastern limit is southwestern Colorado. It can be found south through Nevada, Utah, southeastern California, Arizona, New Mexico, and into western Texas.

Kit foxes inhabit arid and semi-arid regions encompassing desert scrub, chaparral, halophytic regions, and grasslands. Vegetation within preferred habitats vary with regional fauna, but some examples are sagebrush Artemisia tridentata and saltbrush Atriplex polycarpa. Kit foxes may prefer loose textured soils for denning. Kit foxes are occasionally found in agricultural areas, such as orchards, and are sparsely found in urban areas in small numbers. They are found at elevations of 400 to 1,900 meters (1,300 to 6,200 ft) above sea level.

== Behavior ==
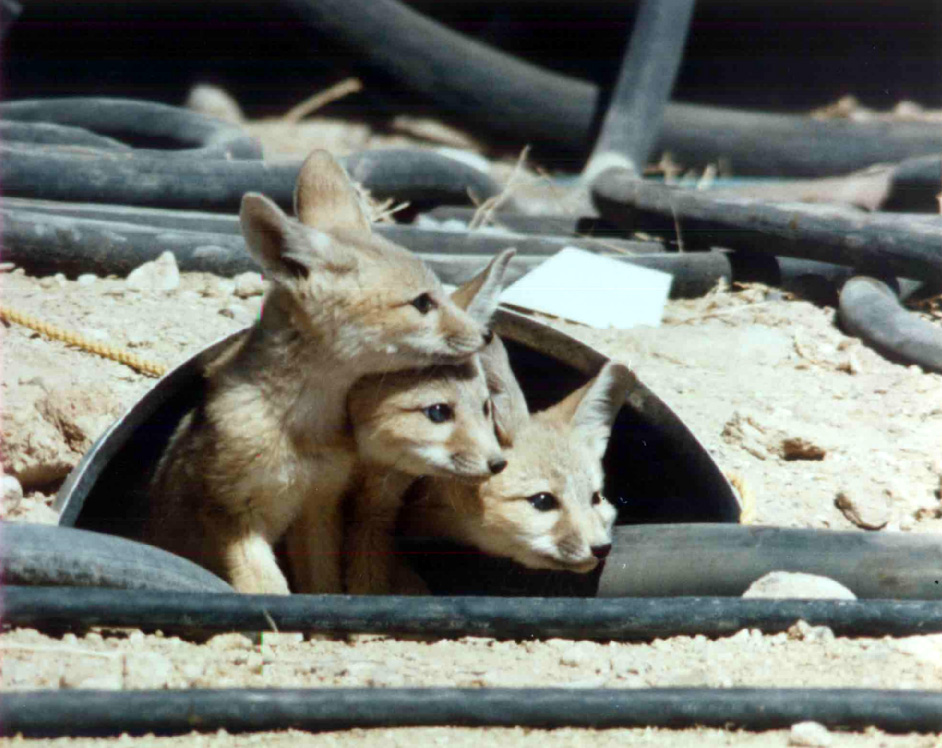
Kit foxes peer from a culvert at a construction site on the Nevada Test Site

Kit foxes are primarily nocturnal and sometimes active during dawn and dusk. During the day, they avoid heat stress by resting in underground dens. Kit foxes normally forage on their own and are not exceptionally territorial, preferring to live in pairs or small groups of relatives. Females are generally thought to be sedentary while males seem to disperse more widely.

Dens are used during the year for daytime resting, escaping predators, avoiding extreme heat, preserving moisture, and carrying and rearing young. Kit foxes will dig their own dens, but they can also modify and use the burrows of badgers, ground squirrels, prairie dogs, and kangaroo rats. Dens are spread across the home range, and an individual fox usually uses more than 11 dens in a given year. They normally rest in their dens during the day, but sometimes can emerge to bask and, when pups are young, to play.

In comparison to many canids that pant only at the resonant frequency of the thorax, kit foxes pant at a rate proportional to the ambient temperature before the rate exceeds the resonant frequency. In doing so, kit foxes exercise the economics of water at the cost of energy. The apparent speed of kit foxes is essentially an illusion created by their limited size and cryptic coloration, and their incredible ability to evade and change directions. An accurate account clocked a fox kit at around 40 km/h in front of the car, but the fox was easily exhausted.

With exceptionally large ears and acute hearing, kit foxes bark at potential threats with a "hacking growl" during interactions with other members among their species.

== Diet ==
Kit foxes are opportunistic omnivores and scavengers, possibly regulated by prey abundance. They primarily exhibit carnivorous tendencies in ideal conditions. In the Californian deserts, its primary prey is Merriam's kangaroo rat (Dipodomys merriami). Black-tailed jackrabbits represent the upper size limit of prey. Other common prey species include lagomorphs, rodents and insects. Kit foxes also consume birds, reptiles, carrion, fish, and rarely, plant material, such as tomatoes (Lycopersicon esculentum), cactus fruits (Carnegiea gigantea) and other fruits. Kit foxes are also known to cache food, and can be found eating human food in urban contests. Kit foxes rarely need to search for drinking water since their diet is sufficient to provide all water and electrolytes. Their digestive tract also efficiently absorbs water from the food they eat.

== Mating and reproduction ==
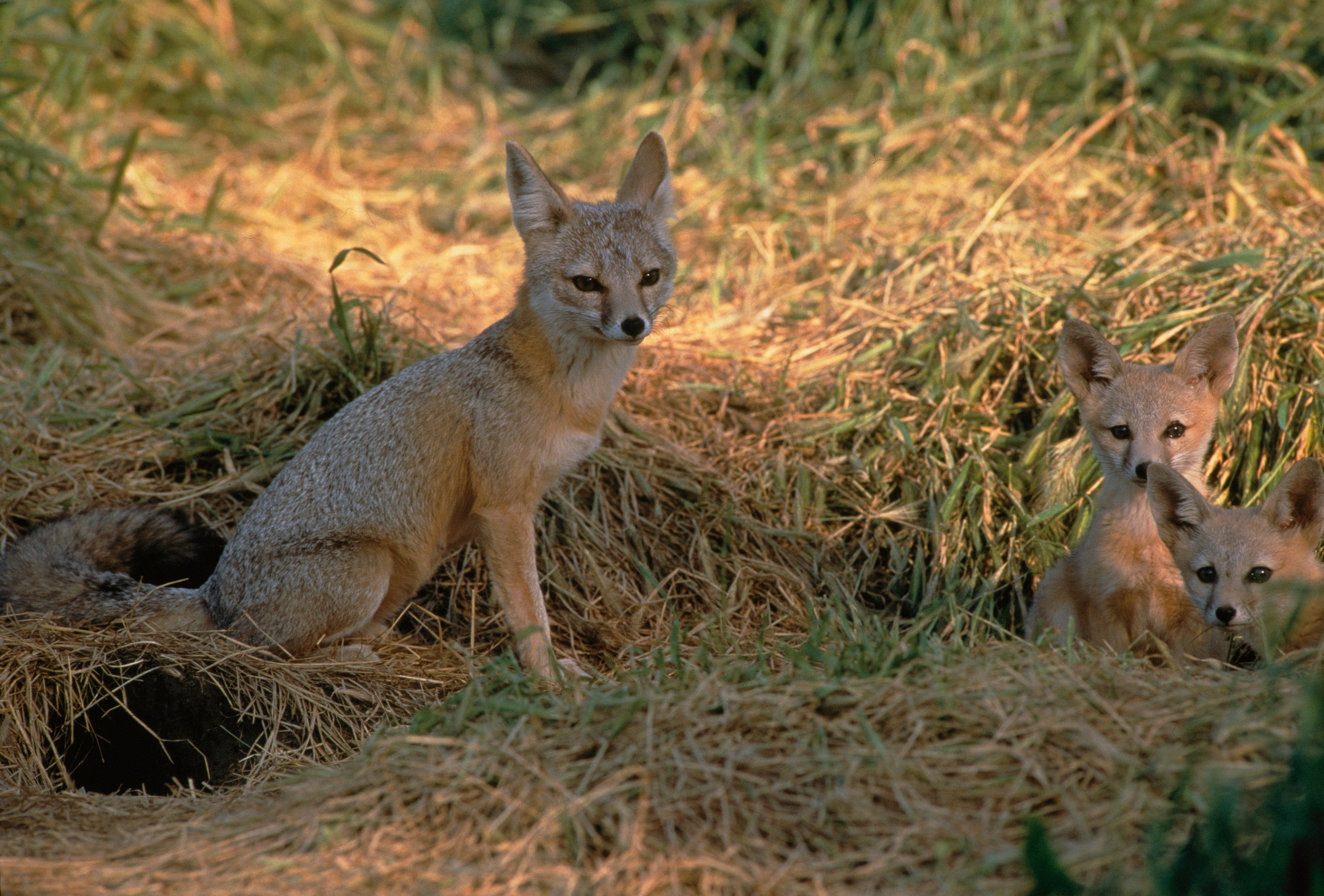
San Joaquin kit fox family

The kit fox is a socially monogamous species, and the mated pair remains together throughout the year. However, polygamous mating relationships have been observed. Female foxes begin searching for natal dens in September and October and usually selected dens are cleaned of debris before the final selection is made. Female young may delay dispersal and stay an additional year to help raise their siblings. No nest is built, but new entrances and tunnels can be added to the den. As with most canids, copulation ends with a "tie" during which the penis is locked in the female's vagina.

Females are monoestrous. Male and female kit foxes usually establish mating pairs during October and November, and they mate from December to January-February. Gestation lasts probably around 49–56 days, and the litters are born in February or March; litter size is usually four or five, and the sex ratio is roughly even. They do not emerge from the den until they are at least four weeks old, and are weaned after about eight weeks and become independent at five to six months old. They become sexually mature at 10 months. Both parents take part in raising and protecting their young. Many females do not reproduce the first year since young females have lower reproductive success than do older females. Pups emerge from the den at about one month of age and spend several hours each day playing outside the entrance. The male seems to do most of the hunting during this period, and later, both parents provide food until the pups start to forage with them at three to four months of age.

Survival and mortality rates of kit foxes can vary significantly year to year. In captivity, they have lived 10 to 12 years; while the average lifespan of a wild kit fox is 5.5 years. One Californian study of 144 kit fox pups showed a 74% mortality rate in pups within the first year.

== Conservation ==
Kit Foxes as a whole are currently state protected and “in least concern” for the federal conservation status. However, the San Joaquin Kit Fox is still one of California’s most endangered mammals within both its state and federal ESA levels. Most common destructions to the habitat are habitat fragmentation, roadway mortality rates, and agricultural landscape conversion.
