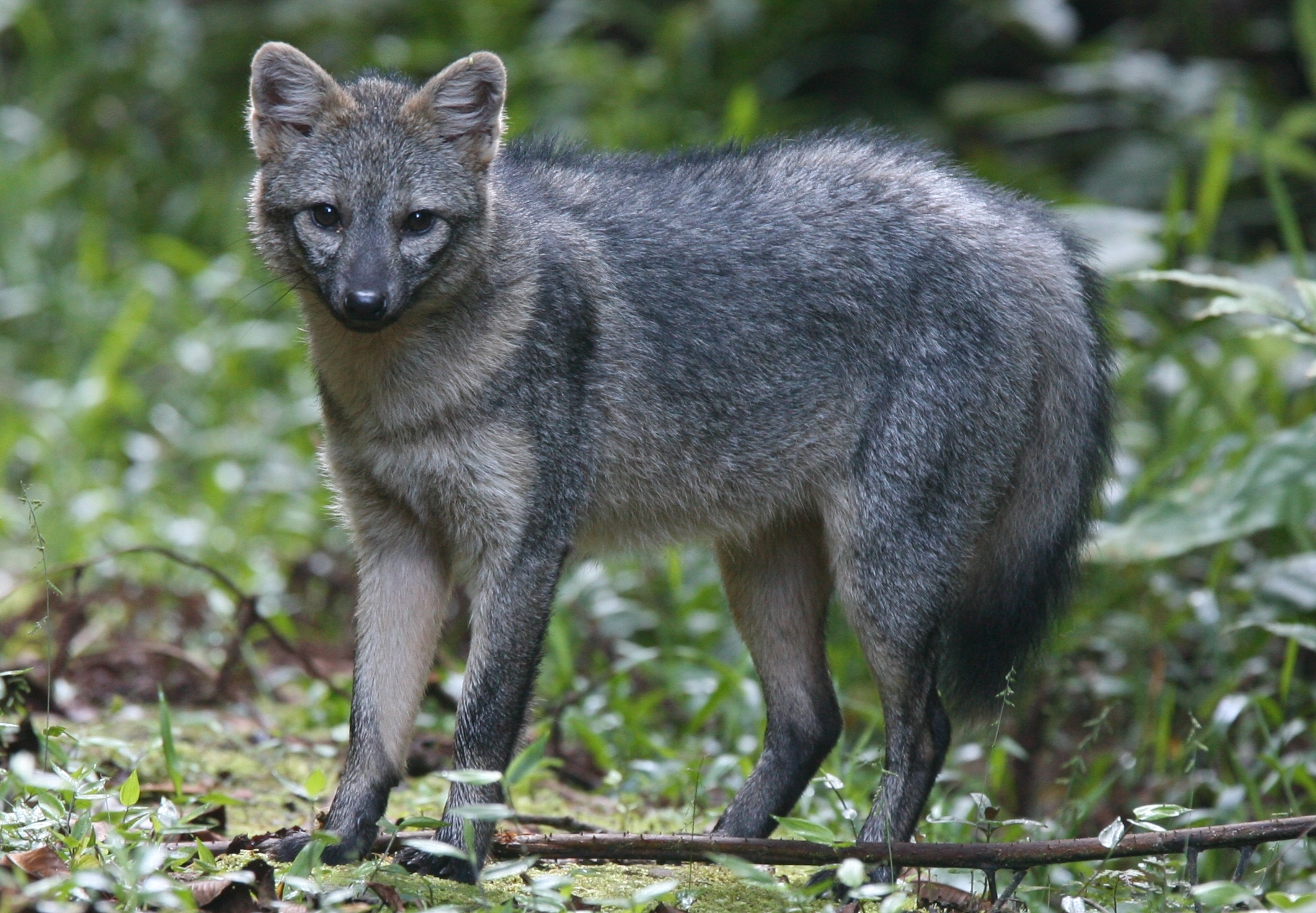
- Cerdocyon thous from Colombia

Conservation status
- Least Concern (IUCN 3.1)
- CITES Appendix II

Scientific classification
- Kingdom: Animalia
- Phylum: Chordata
- Class: Mammalia
- Order: Carnivora
- Family: Canidae
- Tribe: Canini
- Subtribe: Cerdocyonina
- Genus: Cerdocyon; C. E. H. Smith, 1839
- Species: C. thous

Binomial name
- Cerdocyon thous (Linnaeus, 1766)
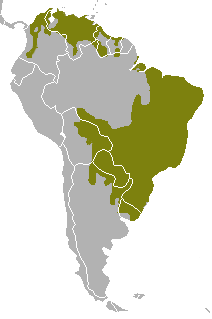
- Crab-eating fox range

Synonyms
- Canis thous Linnaeus, 1766

= Crab-eating fox =

Species of carnivore

The crab-eating fox (Cerdocyon thous), also known as the forest dog, wood fox, bushfox (not to be confused with the bush dog) or maikong, is an extant species of medium-sized canid endemic to the central part of South America since at least the Pleistocene epoch. Like South American foxes, which are in the genus Lycalopex, it is not closely related to true foxes. Cerdocyon comes from the Greek words kerdo (meaning fox) and kyon (dog) referring to the dog- and fox-like characteristics of this animal.

== Taxonomy and evolution ==
The crab-eating fox was originally described as Canis thous by Linnaeus (1766), and first placed in its current genus Cerdocyon by Hamilton-Smith in 1839.

Cerdocyonina is a tribe which appeared around 6.0 million years ago (Mya) in North America as Ferrucyon avius becoming extinct by around 1.4–1.3 Mya. living about 4.7 million years. This genus has persisted in South America from an undetermined time, possibly around 3.1 Mya, and continues to the present in the same or a similar form to the crab-eating fox.

As one of the species of the tribe Canini, it is related to the genus Canis. The crab-eating fox's nearest living relative, as theorized at present, is the short-eared dog. This relationship, however, has yet to be supported by mitochondrial investigations. Two subgenera (Atelocynus and Speothos) were long ago included in Cerdocyon.

The genus Cerdocyon underwent radiational evolution on the South American continent. All close relatives of the crab-eating fox are extinct. It is the only living representative at present of the genus Cerdocyon.

== Description ==
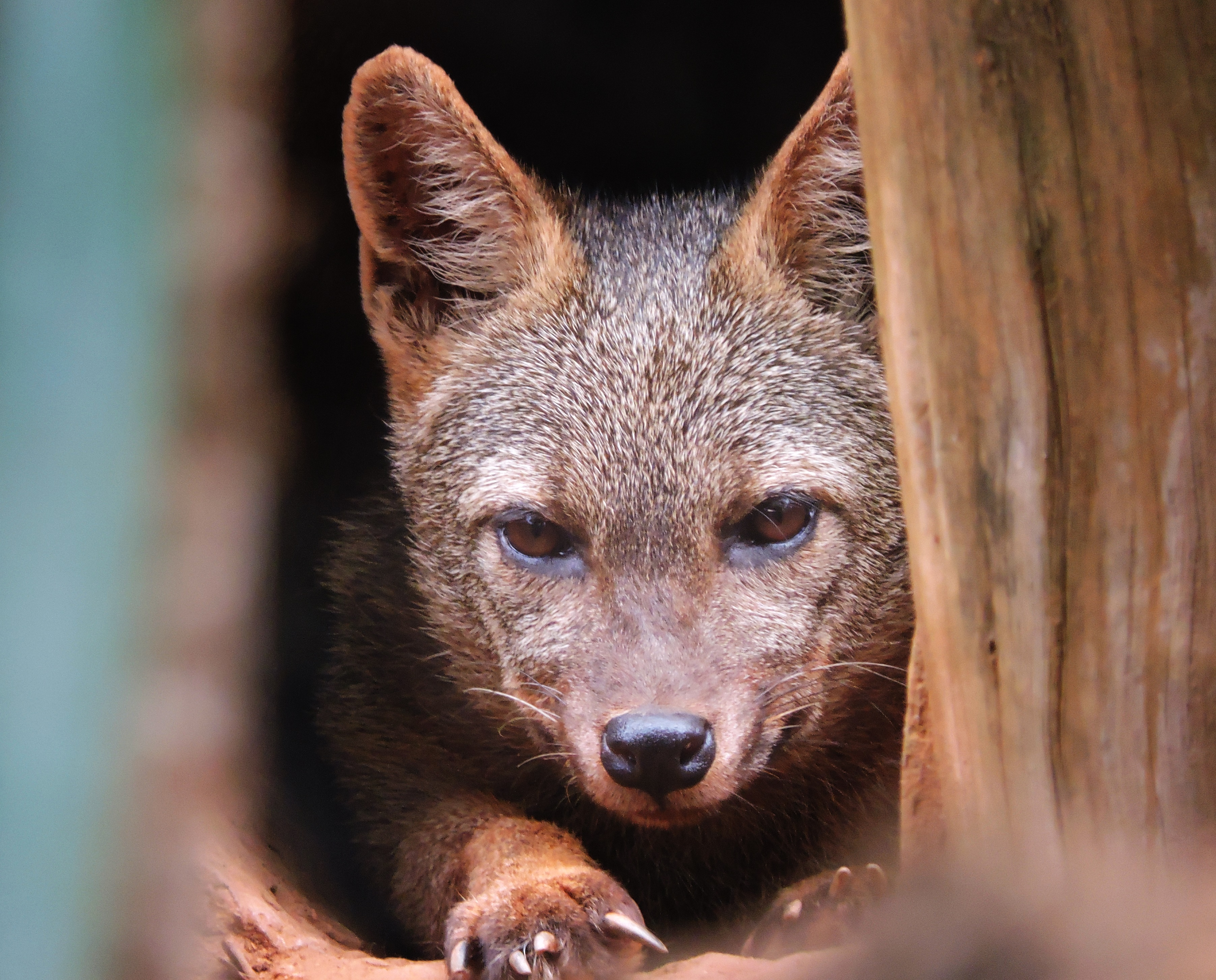
C. thous

The crab-eating fox is predominantly greyish-brown, with areas of red on the face and legs, and black-tipped ears and tail. It has short, strong legs and its tail is long and bushy. The head and body length averages 64.3 centimetres (25.3 in), and the average tail length is 28.5 centimetres (11.2 in). It can weigh between 10 and 17 pounds (4.5 and 7.7 kg).

The coat is short and thick. Coloration varies from grey to brown, to yellowish, to pale, to dark grey. There is a black streak along the back legs, with a black stripe along the spine. On muzzle, ears and paws there is more-reddish fur. The tail, legs and ear tips are black. The ears are wide and round. The torso is somewhat narrow; legs are short but strong. The dense hairy tail stays upright when they are excited. There is significant variation in color between population, from very dark to light grey-yellow.

== Habitat ==
The crab-eating fox is a canid that ranges in savannas; woodlands; subtropical forests; prickly, shrubby thickets; and tropical savannas such as the caatinga, plains, and campo, from Colombia and southern Venezuela in the north to Paraguay, Uruguay and northern Argentina at the southernmost reaches of its range. The crab-eating fox has also been sighted in Panama since the 1990s.

Its habitat also includes wooded riverbanks such as riparian forest. In the rainy season, their range moves uphill, whilst in drier times they move to lower ground. Their habitat covers all environments except rainforests, high mountains, and open grassy savannas. In some regions of their range, they are threatened with extirpation.

== Behaviour and ecology ==
The crab-eating fox creates monogamic teams for hunting; groups of several monogamic pairs may form during the reproductive season. Population density estimates vary between one individual per 4 km^{2} in Venezuela to 0.0003 individuals/km^{2} in Argentinian wetlands. Territorialism was noticed during the dry season; during rainy seasons, when there is more food, they pay less attention to territory. Hideouts and dens often are found in bushes and in thick grass, and there are typically multiple entrance holes per den. Despite being capable of tunneling, they prefer to take over other animals' burrows. Several characteristic sounds are made by the crab-eating fox such as barking, whirring and howling, which occur often when pairs lose contact with one another.

The crab-eating fox is nocturnal, with peaks of activity in the middle of the night and the early morning.

=== Reproduction ===
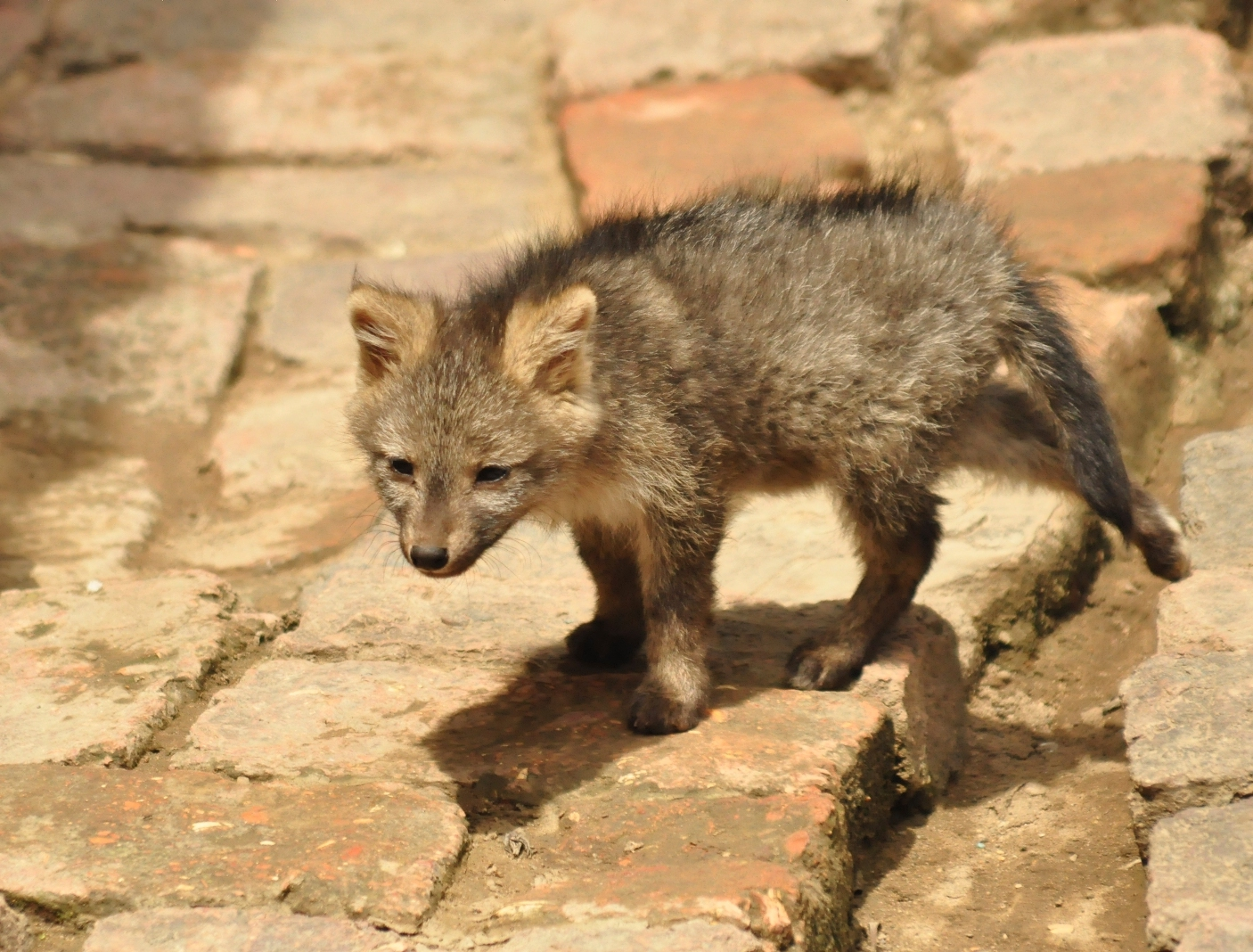
A juvenile crab-eating fox in captivity

The foxes reach sexual maturity within 9–10 months. Adult females give birth to one or two litters per year, depending on the climate and the availability of food. The reproductive period most often begins in November or December, and again in July. The birth of offspring follows after an approximately 56-day gestation, typically in January, February or sometimes March, then again from September to October. If giving birth to one litter, they typically give birth in the early spring. The breeding pair is monogamous and raises the pups together, which are weaned at around three months old and become independent of their parents around 5–8 months old.

=== Diet ===
The crab-eating fox searches for crabs on muddy floodplains during the wet season, giving this animal its common name. It is an opportunist and an omnivore, preferring insects or meat from rodents and birds when available. Other foods readily consumed include other crustaceans, tortoises, turtle eggs, bird eggs, insects, lizards, fruit, and carrion. Their diet is varied and has been found to differ by different researchers, suggesting opportunistic feeding and geographical variation. During the wet season, the diet contains more crustaceans, while during the dry season it contains more insects. The crab-eating fox contributes to the control of rodents and harmful insects.

== Conservation ==
The Convention on International Trade in Endangered Species of Wild Fauna and Flora (CITES) lists the fox as not threatened by extinction. The IUCN lists the crab-eating fox as being of "Least Concern". There are no precise estimates of the population size, but it is common within its range and the population is stable.

It is considered a threat to livestock by farmers, which leads to illegal hunting in some countries. The primary threat to the fox is disease from unvaccinated dogs.

== Subspecies ==
The crab-eating fox has five recognized subspecies, differing in sizes and coloring of fur.

- C. t. thous, Venezuela, Guyana, Suriname, French Guiana North Brazil.
- C. t. azarae, North Brazil.
- C. t. entrerianus, Brazil, Bolivia, Uruguay, Paraguay and Argentina.
- C. t. aquilus, north Venezuela and Colombia.
- C. t. germanus, Bogotá region (Colombia).
