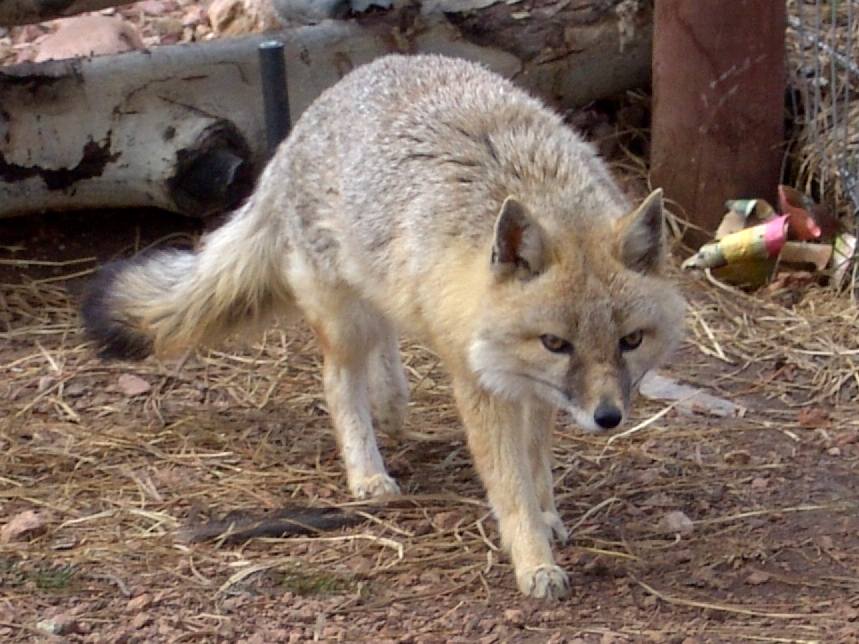
- Swift fox at Colorado Wolf and Wildlife Rescue Center

Conservation status
- Least Concern (IUCN 3.1)

Scientific classification
- Kingdom: Animalia
- Phylum: Chordata
- Class: Mammalia
- Order: Carnivora
- Family: Canidae
- Genus: Vulpes
- Species: V. velox

Binomial name
- Vulpes velox (Say, 1823)
- Current range Estimated former range

Synonyms
- Vulpes velox hebes Merriam, 1902

= Swift fox =

Species of mammal

The swift fox (Vulpes velox) is a small light orange-tan fox around the size of a domestic cat found in the western Great Plains grasslands of North America, such as Montana, Colorado, New Mexico, Kansas, Oklahoma and Texas. It also lives in southern Manitoba, Saskatchewan and Alberta in Canada, where it was previously extirpated. It is closely related to the kit fox (V. macrotis) and some mammalogists classify them as conspecific. However, molecular systematics imply that the two species are distinct. Interbreeding between the two species does occur where their ranges overlap (eastern New Mexico and western Texas), but this hybridization is quite restricted in scope.

The swift fox lives primarily in short-grass prairies and deserts. It became nearly extinct in the 1930s as a result of predator control programs, but was successfully reintroduced later. Currently, the conservation status of the species is considered by the IUCN as Least Concern owing to stable populations elsewhere.

Like most canids, the swift fox is an omnivore, and its diet includes grasses and fruits as well as small mammals, carrion, and insects. In the wild, its lifespan is 3 to 6 years, and it breeds once annually, from late December to March, depending on the geographic region. Pups are born anywhere from March to mid-May, and are weaned at six to seven weeks old.

== Description ==
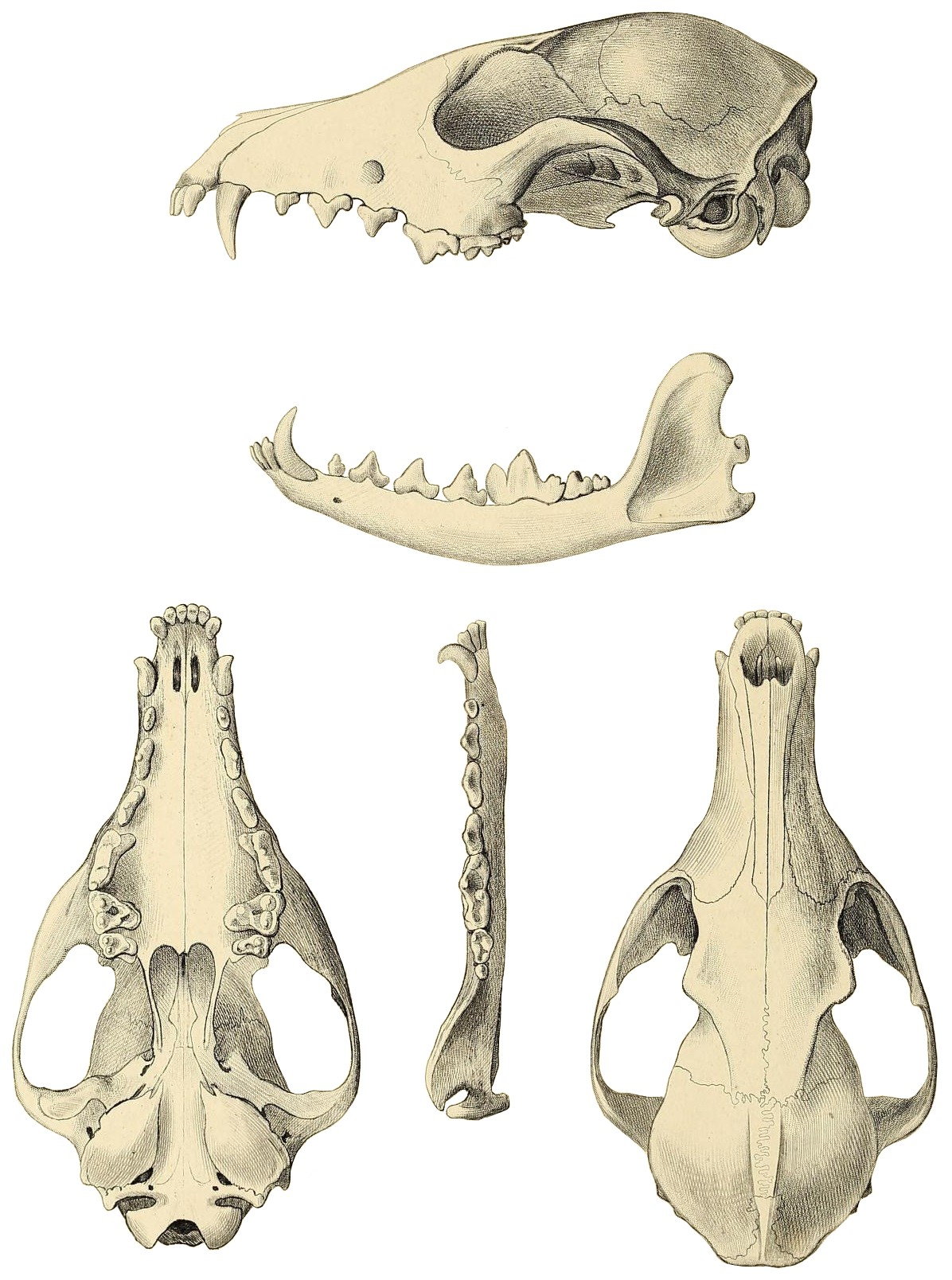
Skull

The swift fox has a dark, grayish, tan coloration that extends to a yellowish tan color across its sides and legs. The throat, chest, and belly range from pale yellow to white in color. Its tail is black-tipped, and it has black patches on its muzzle. Its ears are noticeably large, like those of the kit fox, although slightly farther apart than on the head of the latter. It is about 12 inches (30 cm) in height, and 31 inches (79 cm) long, measuring from the head to the tip of the tail, or about the size of a domestic cat. Its weight ranges from around five to seven pounds. Males and females are similar in appearance, although males are slightly larger.

== Distribution and habitat ==
The swift fox lives in short-grass prairies and western grassland. They form their dens in sandy soil on open prairies, in plowed fields, or along fences. It is native to the Great Plains region of North America, and its range extends north to the southern Alberta and Saskatchewan, Canada, and south to Texas. It reaches from western Iowa to Colorado, Kansas, Wyoming, Nebraska, and Montana.

== Conservation status ==
The swift fox was once a severely endangered species, due to predator control programs in the 1930s that were aimed mostly at the gray wolf and the coyote. The species was extirpated from Canada by 1938, but a reintroduction program started in 1983 has been successful in establishing small populations in southeast Alberta and southwest Saskatchewan, despite the fact that many reintroduced individuals do not survive their first year. Nonetheless, by 1996, 540 foxes had been released around the Alberta-Saskatchewan border and Milk River Ridge areas, parts of the species' original native range. Four years later, those introduced foxes had tripled in number, making the program one of the most successful endangered species reintroduction programs in the world. In May 1999, the Species at Risk Act listed the swift fox as an endangered species in Canada, giving the species further protection for growth. A small, but stable and growing population continues to live freely in the southeastern regions of Alberta, and southwestern regions of Saskatchewan. Canada's national recovery strategy plan was revised in 2008 by the National Swift Fox Recovery Team, with projections of a long-term goal by 2026, "to restore a self-sustaining swift fox population of 1,000 or more mature, reproducing foxes that does not experience greater than a 30% population reduction in any 10-year period".

Exact population numbers of the swift fox are unknown, but it is known that they currently inhabit only 40% of their historic range. In addition to its populations in Canada, there are also swift fox populations in the United States, ranging from South Dakota to Texas. In 1995, the U.S. Fish and Wildlife Service determined that the fox warranted an endangered listing, but other higher priority species precluded its listing. This prompted state wildlife agencies within the fox's range to create the Swift Fox Conservation Team, which worked to implement better swift fox management and monitoring programs. Populations in the United States are stable in the central part of its range, and it is not considered endangered in the United States. The IUCN Red List characterizes it as of Least Concern.

== Behavior and ecology ==
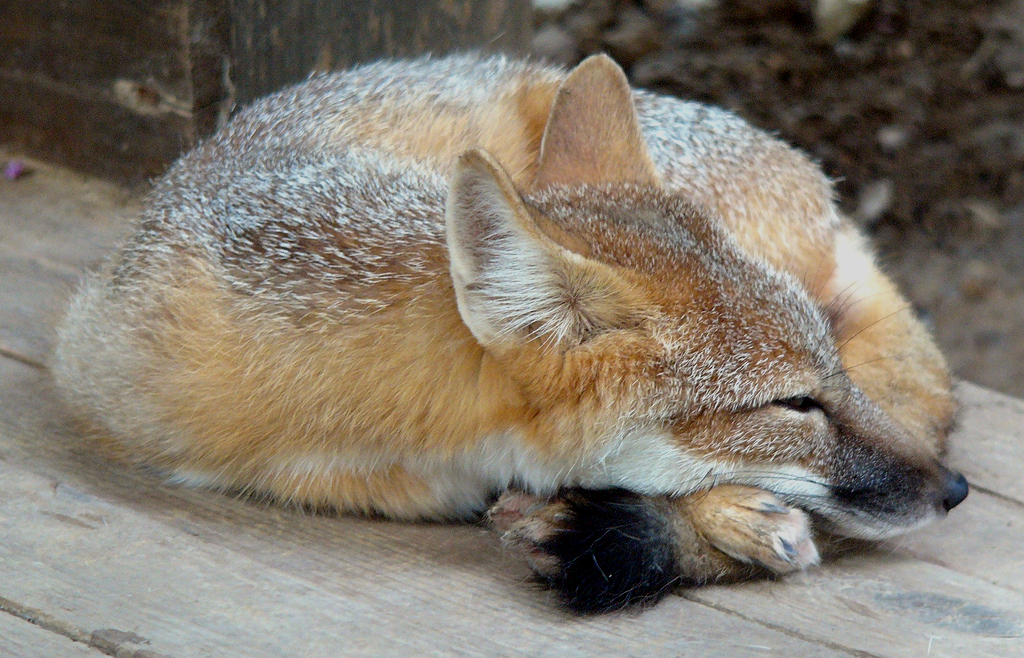
A swift fox napping during the day in a zoo

In the wild, the swift fox usually lives 3–6 years, but may live up to 14 years in captivity. It is primarily nocturnal, spending only evenings and nighttime above ground in the summer. Daytime activities are usually confined to the den, but it has been known to spend the warm midday period above ground during the winter. Due to the harsh winter conditions where the swift fox can be found, there is an increase in mortality rates. The swift fox is more heavily dependent on its den than most North American canids, using them as shelter from predators. These dens are usually burrows that are two to four meters in length. It has been known to run very fast, at speeds of over 50 km/h (30 mph). or up to 60 km/h (40 mph) The coyote is the swift fox's main predator, but at times chooses not to consume the swift fox, killing it more often as competition than as prey. Other predators include the American badger, golden eagle, and bobcat. It is also vulnerable to trapping and poisoning, as well as death on highways.

=== Reproduction ===
Swift foxes are a socially monogamous species, although multiple breeding strategies have been observed. The adult swift fox's breeding season varies with region. In the southern United States, it mates between December and February with pups born in March and early April, while in Canada, the breeding season begins in March, and pups are born in mid-May. The male swift fox matures and may mate at one year, while the female usually waits until her second year before breeding. Adults live in pairs, and although some individuals mate for life, others choose different partners each year. Gestation takes around 51 days, and four to five kits are born.

The swift fox only has one litter annually, but may occupy up to thirteen dens in one year, moving because prey is scarce or because skin parasites build up inside the den. Sometimes it makes other burrows from other bigger animals, even though it is completely capable of digging one on its own. Pups are born in the den and typically remain there for approximately one month. A newborn pup's eyes and ears remain closed for ten to fifteen days, leaving it dependent on the mother for food and protection during this time. It is usually weaned around six or seven weeks old and remains with its parents until fall. Recent research has shown that social organization in the swift fox is unusual among canids, since it is based on the females. Females maintain territories at all times, but males emigrate if the resident female is killed or removed.

=== Diet ===
Like most foxes, the swift fox is an omnivore. Rabbits, mice, ground squirrels, birds, insects, other arthropods, lizards, amphibians, fish and eggs are staples. Grasses and fruits round out its diet. However, like any efficient forager, the swift fox takes advantage of seasonal foods. During the summer, adults eat large amounts of insects, including beetles and grasshoppers, and feed their young with larger prey items. Deer and other carrion killed by other animals may also be important food sources.
