= Cnemaspis anslemi =

Scientific classification
- Kingdom: Animalia
- Phylum: Chordata
- Class: Reptilia
- Order: Squamata
- Suborder: Gekkota
- Family: Gekkonidae
- Genus: Cnemaspis
- Species: C. anslemi

Binomial name
- Cnemaspis anslemi Ukuwela & Karunarathna, 2019

Species of lizard

Cnemaspis anslemi, or Anslems' day gecko, is a species of diurnal gecko endemic to island of Sri Lanka described from northwestern foothills of Samanalawewa Nature Reserve.

== Etymology ==
The specific name anslemi honors Sri Lankan herpetologist Anslem de Silva, who has worked nearly five decades on Sri Lanka herpetofauna. He is commonly known as the father of modern herpetology in Sri Lanka.

== Taxonomy ==
The species is closely related to C. gemunu, C. godagedarai, C. phillipsi, and C. scalpensis.

== Ecology ==
The species is restricted to home gardens and tropical evergreen rainforests in the Udamaliboda area, Lihinihela, Borangamuwa, and Warnagala areas. Researchers described the species as critically endangered due to tea and rubber plantations and mini hydropower plants.

It is sympatric with many other gecko species, including Cnemaspis samanalensis, Cyrtodactylus triedrus, Gehyra mutilata, Hemidactylus depressus, H. pieresii, H. frenatus, H. parvimaculatus, and Hemiphyllodactylus typus''.

== Description ==
Snout to vent length of adult male is 34.4 mm and female is 32.5 mm. Body slender and long. Eye relatively small with round pupil. Dorsum is covered with smooth granular scales. Chin and gular scales are smooth. Tubercles are well developed. Males have no precloacal pores. Dorsum is reticulated brown, black, and white in color with two large oval shaped patches on the neck region. Head has scattered black and white dots. Dark canthal stripe is indistinct. Chin and gular areas are bright yellow. Neck is bright yellow with black dots in zig-zag pattern. Femur is dirty yellow. Tail has 13–15 cinnamon brown blotches. Eggs are pure white and spherical.
