= Dasia haliana =

Haly's tree skink

Conservation status
- Vulnerable (IUCN 3.1)

Scientific classification
- Kingdom: Animalia
- Phylum: Chordata
- Class: Reptilia
- Order: Squamata
- Family: Scincidae
- Genus: Dasia
- Species: D. haliana

Binomial name
- Dasia haliana (Nevill in Haly & Nevill, 1887)

Synonyms
- Euprepes halianus Nevill in Haly & Nevill, 1887; Theconyx halianus — Annandale, 1906; Lygosoma (Keneuxia) halianus — Deraniyagala, 1931; Dasia haliana — M.A. Smith 1935

Species of lizard

The Haly's tree skink (Dasia haliana) is a species of lizard in the family Scincidae. The species is native to Sri Lanka. Earlier thought to be found also in the Western Ghats, taxonomic studies have shown D. haliana to be a Sri Lankan endemic, differentiated from the Indian D. subcaeruleum. D. haliana is the only arboreal skink in Sri Lanka.

== Description ==
An arboreal skink, with a snout-to-vent length (SVL) of about 8 cm (3.1 in), D. haliana is distinct from all other sister species in having a smaller number of scale rows at the mid-body (22-24) and an enlarged set of vertebral row scales.

Like other reptiles its taxonomic identification is based on scalation. It has a pointed snout, and the distance from the nostril to the tip of the snout is longer than the diameter of the eye. The scales above the nostril are not in contact with each other and the fronto-nasal scale is equal in width and length. The prefrontals are large and are separated from another narrow frontal. The interparietal scale is variable in size and when large separates the parietals. There are a pair of nuchal (nape) scales. There are four scales above the eye with the second being largest and the first and second in contact with the frontal. There are 7 or 8 supraciliaries, with the first being longer than the others. There are two loreals which are longer than their height. The temporal scales are larger than the scales on the sides of the neck. The tympanum of the ear is sunken and is less than a fourth of the diameter of the eye.

The dorsal scales have 3 or 5 blunt keels, and the two vertebral rows of dorsal scales are wider than the rest. The tail tapers to a point and is as long as the head and body. The limbs are short, and the toes are long, with 17 or 18 lamellae (or plate like scales) beneath the fourth toe. The palms and soles have flat tubercles with larger ones on the heel, especially in the male.

The colouration is yellowish-olive above, with broad black bands which are as wide as the spaces between them. There are 5 or 6 of these bands on the neck and body, with a black mark on the occiput extending forward as streaks on top of the head. There are two lateral stripes passing through the eye and nostril. The underside is yellow.

== Behaviour and geographic range ==
D. haliana is the only arboreal skink in Sri Lanka. It is known much from the dry zone of the country, including Pallegama, Dambulla, Polonnaruwa, Bakamuna, Horana, Anuradhapura, Palatupana, Gampaha and Jaffna. It was also reported from southern India but the species that occurs there was found to be different and given the name of Dasia johnsinghi.

== Habitat ==
The preferred natural habitat of D. halianus is forest, at altitudes of 450–1,200 m (1,480–3,940 ft).

== Ecology ==
D. haliana is confined to the dry and intermediate zones of the island of Sri Lanka, where it is found on large vine-covered trees, occupying tree holes as refuge.

== Reproduction ==
D. haliana is oviparous. Clutch size is two eggs. Copulation is known in late January, and eggs are laid in early March.

== Other sources ==
- Annandale N (1906). "New and interesting lizards in the Colombo Museum". Spolia Zeylandica 3: 189–192.
- Deraniyagala PEP (1931). "Some Ceylon Lizards". Ceylon Journal of Science B 16: 139–180.
- Greer AE (1970). "The Relationships of the Skinks Referred to the Genus Dasia". Breviora (348): 1–30.
- Joshua, Justus; Sekar, A.G. (1985). "Range extension of the skink Dasia haliana (H. Nevill, 1887)". Journal of the Bombay Natural History Society 82 (2): 422–423.
- Karthikeyan S (1991). "Sighting of the arboreal skink Dasia haliana at Mundanthurai Wildlife Sanctuary, Tamil Nadu". J. Bombay Nat. Hist. Soc. 88 (1): 122–123.
