= Samanala =

Samanala may refer to:

- Samanala Dam, a dam in Sri Lanka
- Samanala Thatu, a 2005 Sri Lanka film
- Samanalakanda, a mountain in Sri Lanka
- Samanala Sandhawaniya, a 2013 Sri Lanka film
- Samanala Hydroelectric Power Station, a dam in Sri Lanka
- Samanala day gecko, a species of lizard
