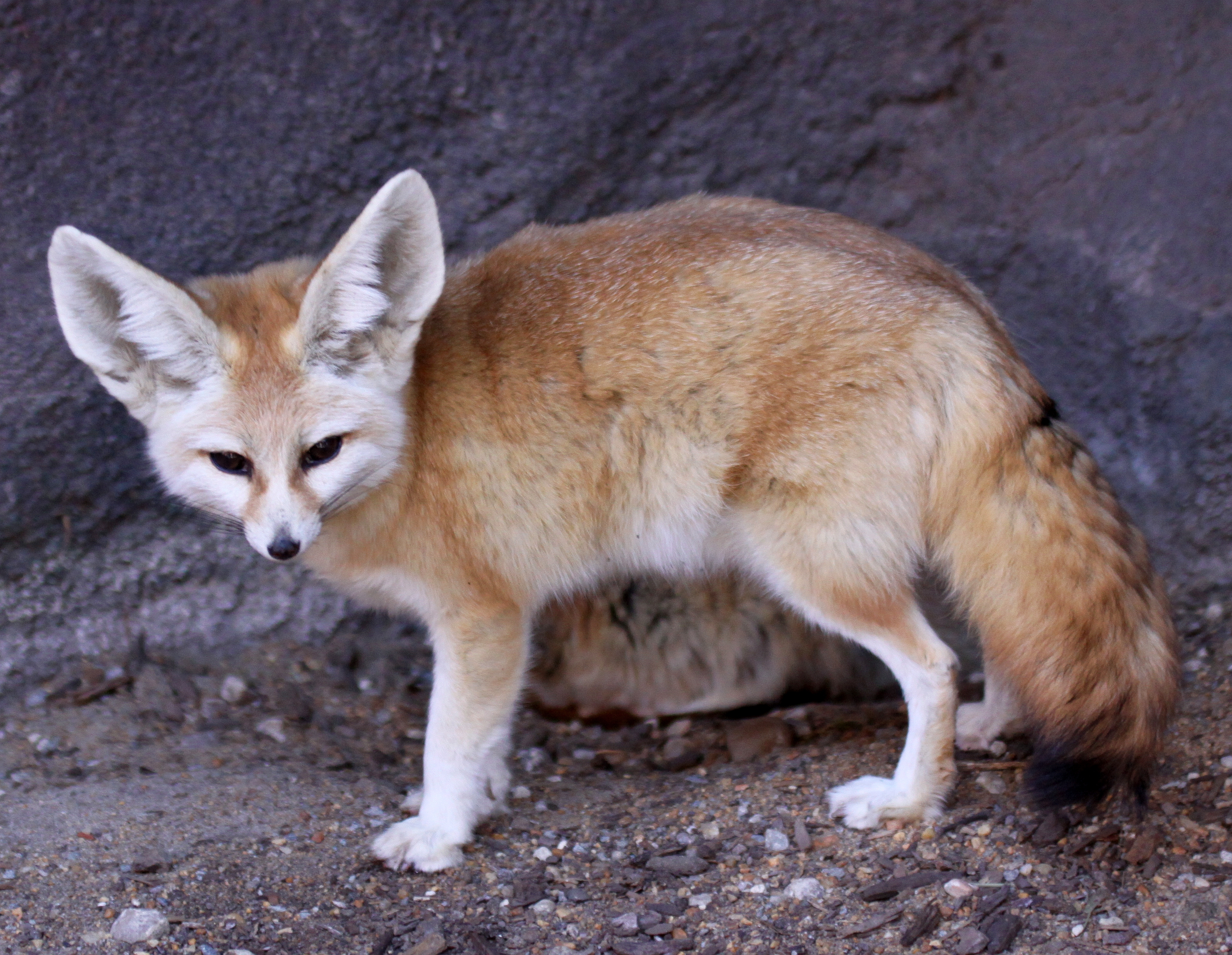
- Fennec fox in Norfolk Zoo

Conservation status
- Least Concern (IUCN 3.1)
- CITES Appendix II

Scientific classification
- Kingdom: Animalia
- Phylum: Chordata
- Class: Mammalia
- Order: Carnivora
- Family: Canidae
- Genus: Vulpes
- Species: V. zerda

Binomial name
- Vulpes zerda (Zimmermann, 1780)
- Range of the Fennec fox Extant (resident)

Synonyms
- Canis zerda Zimmermann, 1780; Canis cerdo Gmelin, 1788; Viverra aurita Meyer, 1793; Fennecus arabicus Desmarest, 1804; Megalotis cerda Illiger, 1811; Fennecus brucei Desmarest, 1820; Canis fennecus Lesson, 1827; Vulpes denhamii Boitard, 1842; Vulpes zuarensis J.E. Gray, 1843

= Fennec fox =

Species of fox

The fennec fox (Vulpes zerda) is a small fox native to the deserts of North Africa, ranging from Western Sahara and Mauritania to the Sinai Peninsula. Its most distinctive feature is its unusually large ears, which serve to dissipate heat and listen for underground prey. The fennec is the smallest fox species. Its coat, ears, and kidney functions have adapted to the desert environment with high temperatures and little water.

The fennec fox mainly eats insects, small mammals and birds. It has a life span of up to 14 years in captivity and about 10 years in the wild. Pups are preyed upon by the Pharaoh eagle-owl; both adults and pups may fall prey to jackals and striped hyenas. Fennec families dig out burrows in the sand for habitation and protection, which can be as large as 120 m^{2} (1,300 sq ft) and adjoin the burrows of other families. Precise population figures are not known but are estimated from the frequency of sightings; these indicate that the fennec fox is currently not threatened by extinction. Knowledge of social interactions is limited to information gathered from captive animals. The fennec fox is commonly trapped for exhibition or sale in North Africa, and it is considered an exotic pet in some parts of the world.

== Taxonomy and phylogeny ==
1890 illustration of fennec fox as Canis zerda by John Gerrard Keulemans

The fennec fox was scientifically described as Canis zerda by Eberhardt Zimmermann in 1780. In 1788, Johann Friedrich Gmelin gave the species the synonym of Canis cerdo with the type locality being the Sahara Desert. A few years later, Friedrich Albrecht Anton Meyer assigned the name Viverra aurita to the species in 1793; the type locality was Algeria. Subsequent synonyms include Fennecus arabicus by Anselme Gaëtan Desmarest in 1804; Megalotis cerda by Johann Karl Wilhelm Illiger in 1811 which was based on earlier descriptions by Gmelin, and another synonym by Desmarest (Fennecus brucei) in 1820; the type locality was Algeria, Tunisia, Libya, and Sudan. In 1827, the species was given another synonym (Canis fennecus) by René Lesson whose work was largely based on the species scientific description in 1780. In the 1840s, the species received synonyms by Pierre Boitard in 1842 (Vulpes denhamii) and John Edward Gray in 1843 (Vulpes zuarensis). The type localities of these were "interior of Africa" and Egypt, respectively. In 1978 Gordon Barclay Corbet renamed the species to Vulpes zerda, its current scientific name. It was originally assigned to the genus Canis, but following molecular analysis it was moved to Vulpes despite having some distinct morphological and behavioral traits.

According to DNA evidence, the closest living relative to the fennec fox is the Blanford's fox. They are two of eight "desert fox" species, which is a group of Vulpes that share comparable ecologies, the others being the corsac fox, pale fox, kit fox, Tibetan fox, Rüppell's fox and Cape fox. All eight species evolved to survive in desert environments, developing several traits such as sandy colored coats, large ears, pigmented eyes, and specialized kidneys. The word fennec is derived from the Arabic word fanak which likely has Persian origins.

The fennec fox is one of 12 extant Vulpes species and a member of the family Canidae. The cladogram below is based on the phylogeny by Lindblad-Toh (2005) modified to incorporate recent findings on Vulpes.

- Vulpes
  - - Vulpes zerda (Fennec fox)
    - Vulpes cana (Blanford's fox)
  - - Vulpes chama (Cape fox)
    - - - - Vulpes vulpes (Red fox)
          - Vulpes rueppellii (Rüppell's fox)
        - - Vulpes corsac (Corsac fox)
          - Vulpes ferrilata (Tibetan fox)
      - - Vulpes macrotis (Kit fox)
        - Vulpes lagopus (Arctic fox)

== Description ==
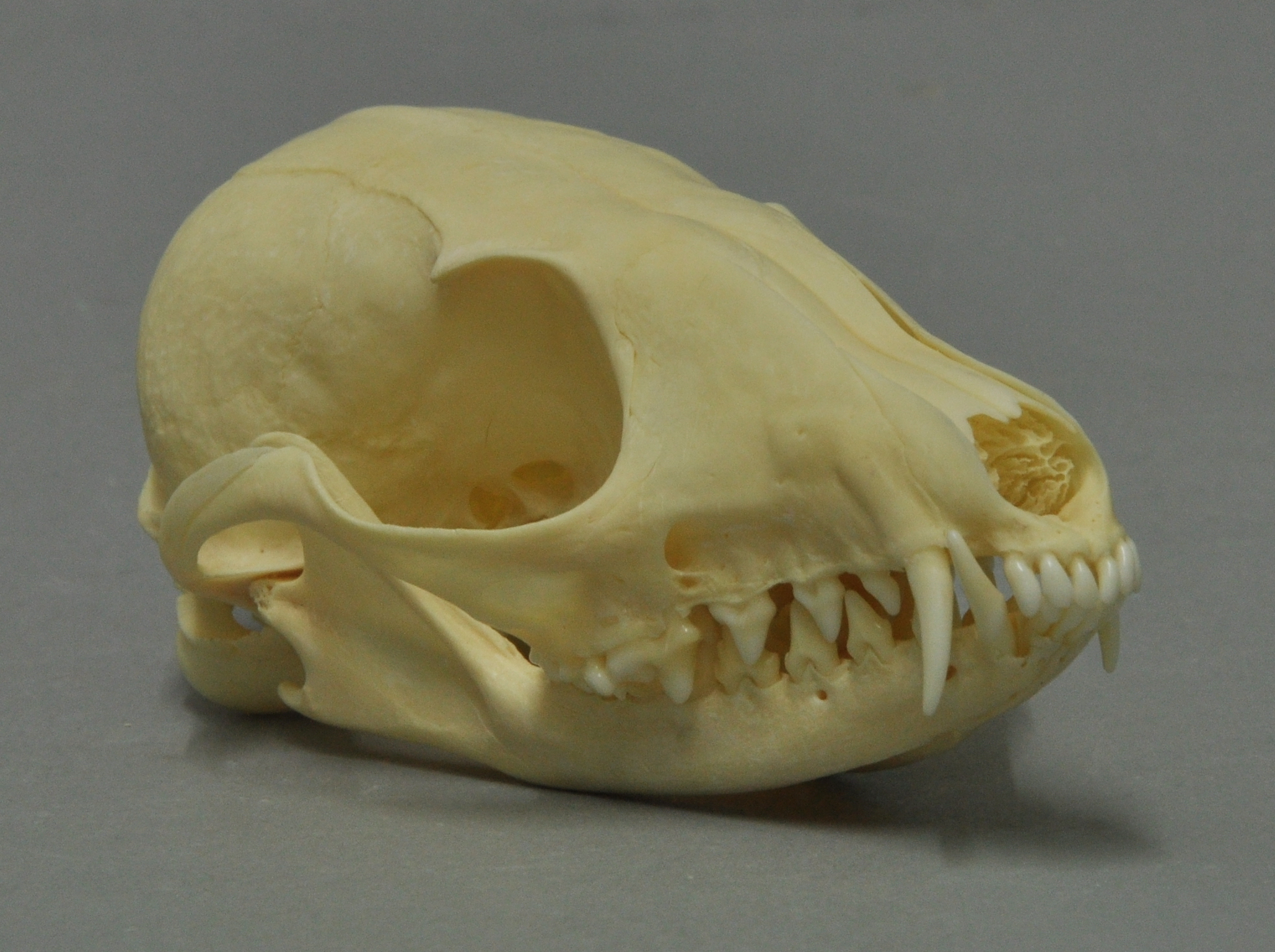
Skull of a fennec fox

The fennec fox has sand-colored fur which reflects sunlight during the day and helps keep it warm at night. Its nose is black and its tapering tail has a black tip. Its long ears have longitudinal reddish stripes on the back and are so densely haired inside that the external auditory meatus is not visible. The edges of the ears are whitish, but darker on the back. The ear to body ratio is the greatest in the canid family and likely helps in dissipating heat and locating prey. It has large, dense kidneys with somewhat compact medulla, which help store water in times of scarcity. It has dark streaks running from the inner eye to either side of the slender muzzle. Its large eyes are dark. The dental formula is 3.1.4.23.1.4.3 × 2 = 42 with small and narrow canines. The pads of its paws are covered with dense fur, which facilitates walking on hot, sandy soil.

The fennec fox is the smallest canid species. Females range in head-to-body size from 34.5 to 39.5 cm (13.6 to 15.6 in) with a 23–25 cm (9.1–9.8 in) long tail and 9–9.5 cm (3.5–3.7 in) long ears, and weigh 1–1.9 kg (2.2–4.2 lb). Males are slightly larger, ranging in head-to-body size from 39 to 39.5 cm (15.4 to 15.6 in) with a 23–25 cm (9.1–9.8 in) long tail and 10 cm (3.9 in) long ears, weighing at least 1.3 kg (2.9 lb).

== Distribution and habitat ==
The fennec fox is distributed throughout the Sahara, from Morocco and Mauritania to northern Sudan, through Egypt and its Sinai Peninsula. It inhabits small sand dunes and vast treeless sand areas with sparse vegetation such as grasses, sedges and small shrubs. In the northern part of its range annual rainfalls have been recorded at <100 mm compared to 300 mm in its southern range. The fennec fox's range likely overlaps with that of other canines such as the golden jackal and Rüppell's fox. Compared to these canids, the fennec fox seems to inhabit areas with more extreme climate and has been known to build burrows in grainier surfaces; this adaptation gives it an edge over competitors.

== Behaviour and ecology ==
=== Behaviour ===
A fennec fox call

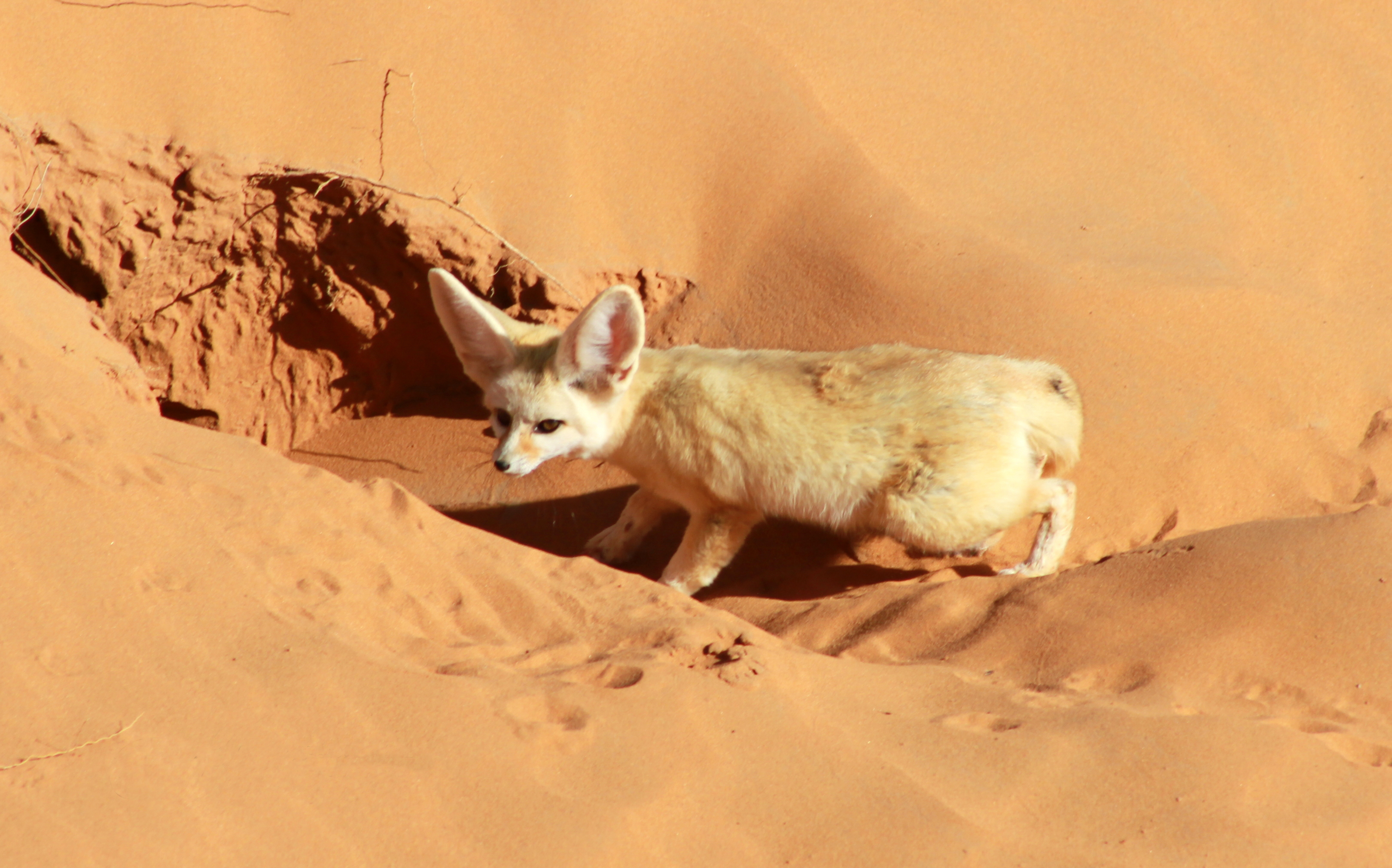
Fennec fox in the Moroccan Sahara

Fennec foxes are primarily nocturnal, displaying heightened activity during the cooler nighttime hours. This behaviour helps them escape the extreme Saharan heat and reduces water loss through panting. A fennec fox digs its den in sand, either in open areas or places sheltered by plants with stable sand dunes. In compacted soils, dens are up to 120 m^{2} (1,300 sq ft) large, with up to 15 different entrances. In some cases, different families interconnect their dens, or locate them close together. In soft, looser sand, dens tend to be simpler with only one entrance leading to a single chamber.

Captive individuals reside in family groups. Fennec foxes exhibit playful behavior, especially among younger individuals.

=== Hunting and diet ===
The fennec fox is omnivorous, feeding on small rodents, lizards (geckos and skinks), small birds and their eggs, insects, fruits, leaves, roots and also some tubers. It relies on the moisture content of prey, but drinks water when available. It hunts alone and digs in the sand for small vertebrates and insects. Some individuals were observed to bury prey for later consumption and searching for food in the vicinity of human settlements.

In the Algerian Sahara, 114 scat samples were collected that contained more than 400 insects, plant fragments and date palm (Phoenix dactylifera) fruits, remains of birds, mammals, squamata and insects.

=== Reproduction ===
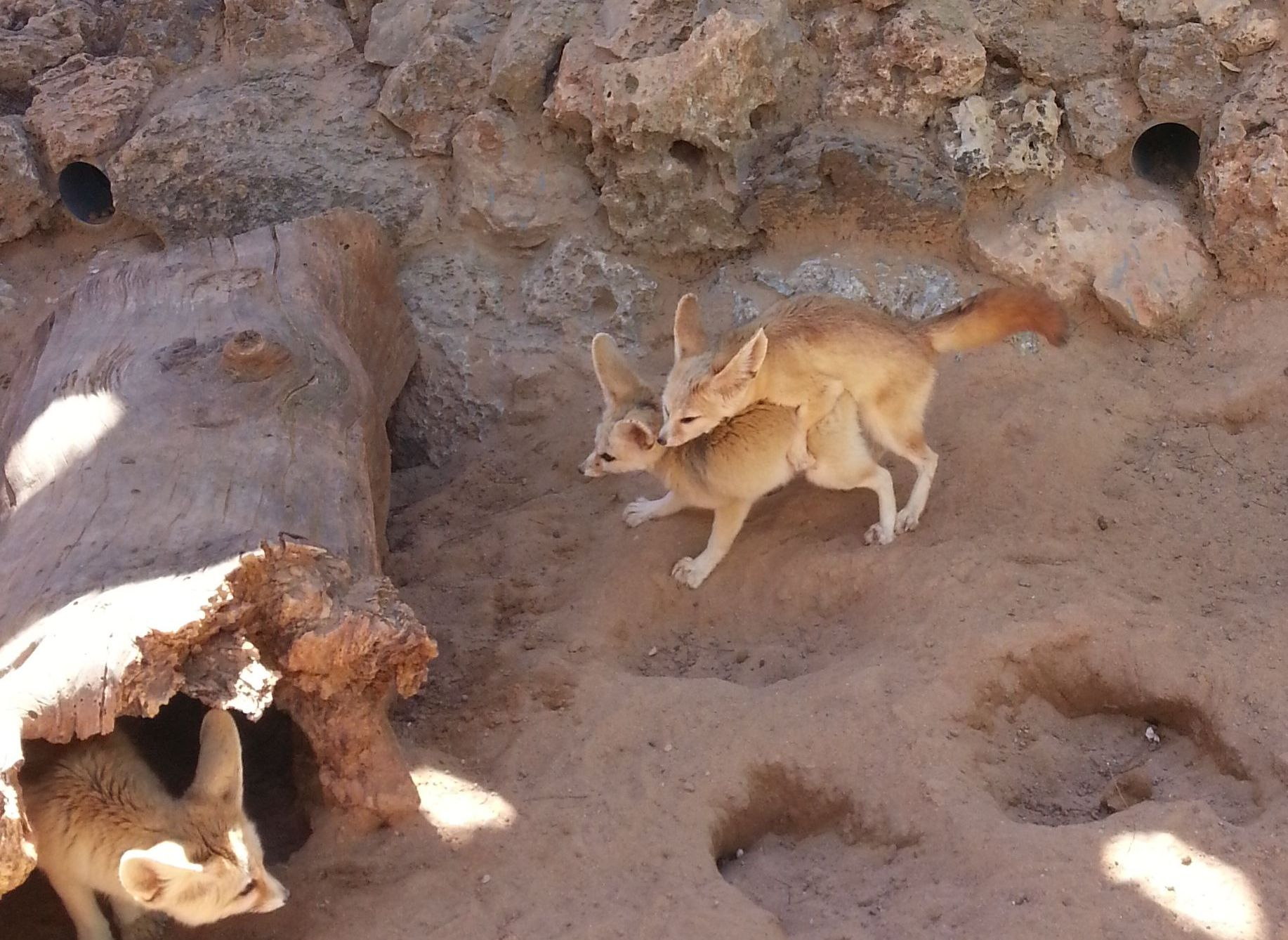
Male fennec fox mounting a female

Fennec foxes mate for life. Captive animals reach sexual maturity at around nine months and mate between January and April. Female fennec foxes are in estrus for an average of 24 hours and usually breed once per year; the copulation tie lasts up to two hours and 45 minutes. Gestation usually lasts between 50 and 52 days, though sometimes up to 63 days. After mating, the male becomes aggressive and protects the female, and provides her with food during pregnancy and lactation. Females give birth between March and June to a litter of one to four pups that open their eyes after 8 to 11 days. Both female and male care for the pups. They communicate by barking, purring, yapping and squeaking. Pups remain in the family even after a new litter is born. The pups are weaned at the age of 61 to 70 days. Adults rear pups until they are around 16 to 17 weeks old. The average lifespan in the wild is 10 years. The oldest captive male fennec fox was 14 years old, and the oldest female 13 years.

=== Predators, parasites and diseases ===
African horned owl species such as the Pharaoh eagle-owl prey on fennec fox pups. Anecdotal reports exist about jackals and striped hyenas also preying on the fennec fox. But according to nomads, the fennec fox is fast and changes directions so well that even their Salukis are hardly ever able to capture it.

Captive fennec foxes are susceptible to canine distemper virus, displaying fever, mucopurulent ocular discharge, diarrhea, severe emaciation, seizures, generalized ataxia, severe dehydration, brain congestion, gastric ulcers and death. Stress because of capture and long-distance transportation are thought to be the causes. In 2012, a study reported a case of Trichophyton mentagrophytes, a fungus species, in a 2-year-old male. It died not too long after contracting the pathogen from anorexia and icterus. A 2019 review of the deaths of fennec foxes due to medical conditions or pathogens at the Bronx and Prospect Park Zoos since 1980 found that the majority of such deaths were attributed to neoplasia and infection. Most foxes developed infections or medical conditions from atopic dermatitis and other dermatologic diseases, as well as trauma. Parasites known to infect the fennec fox include roundworms such as Capillaria and Angiostrongylus vasorum, as well as the alveolate Toxoplasma gondii.

== Threats ==
In North Africa, the fennec fox is commonly trapped for exhibition or sale to tourists. Expansion of permanent human settlements in southern Morocco caused its disappearance in these areas and restricted it to marginal areas. Other factors such as roadwork, seismic surveys, mining, oil fields, commercial expansion and the increased number of human communities in their range are cited as potential threats.

=== Conservation ===
As of 2015, the fennec fox is classified as of least concern on the IUCN Red List. It is listed in CITES Appendix II and is protected in Morocco and Western Sahara, Algeria, Tunisia and Egypt, where it has been documented in several protected areas. Another measure taken to conserve the species is the placement of individuals in captive environments such as zoos. Educational programs are also promoted to further this initiative.

== Interactions with humans ==
=== In culture ===
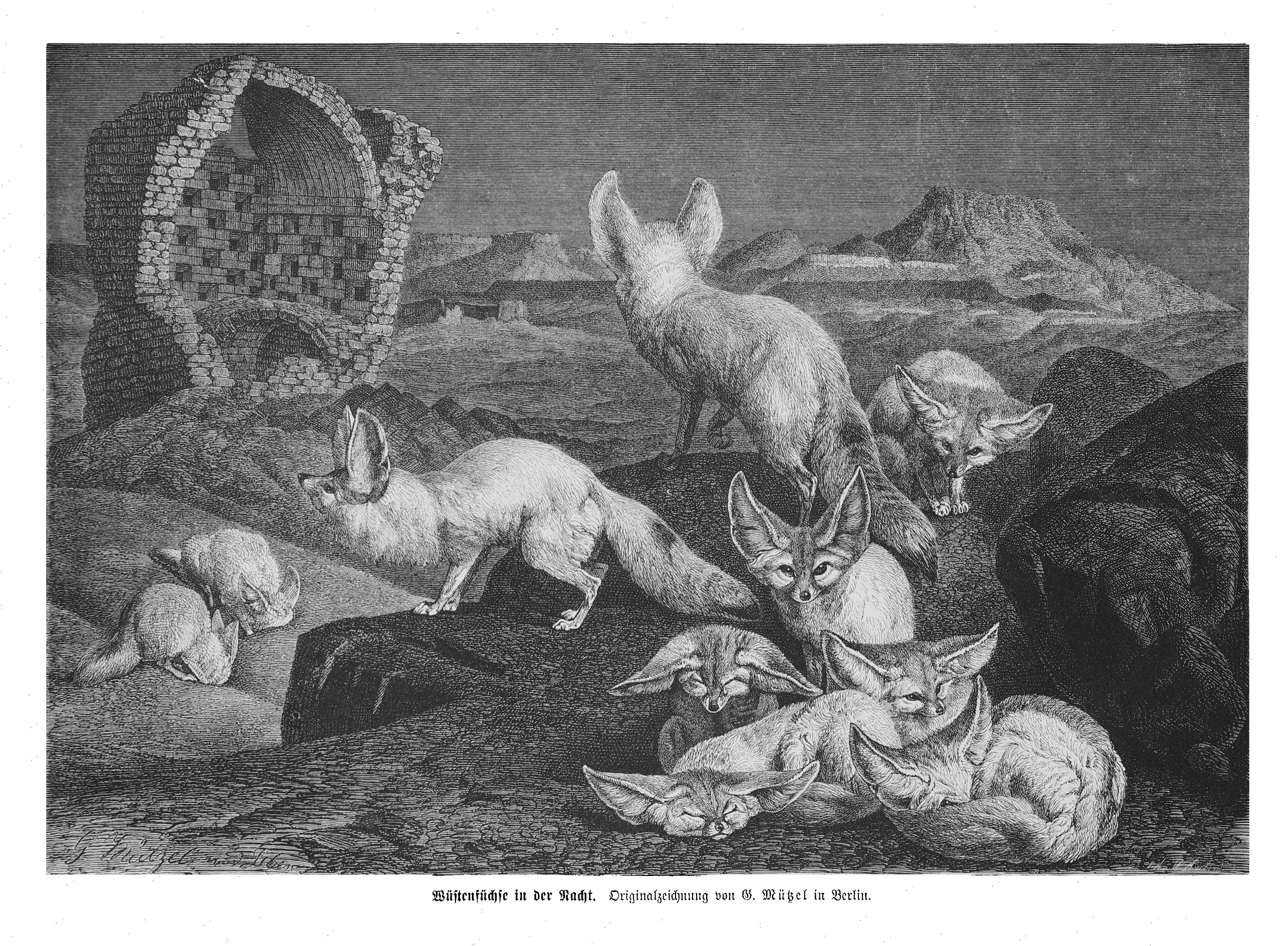
A drawing of a skulk of fennec foxes by Gustav Mützel, 1876

The fennec fox is the national animal of Algeria. It also serves as the nickname for the Algeria national football team "Les Fennecs". The species is depicted in The Little Prince, a 1943 novella by Antoine de Saint-Exupéry which follows the story of a pilot who is forced to make an emergency plane landing in the remote Sahara Desert. In 2000, the fennec fox was portrayed on the cover of a Ranger Rick magazine. In Roman art and literature, there is dearth of depictions of fox species in general. However, according to Martial's Epigrams, which describes the "long-eared fox" as a popular pet, it is likely that the fennec fox was kept as an exotic pet in the Roman empire. Additionally, the species has made appearances as Fenneko in the anime TV series Aggretsuko.

=== In captivity ===
The fennec fox is bred commercially as an exotic pet. Commercial breeders remove the pups from their mother to hand-raise them, as tame foxes are more valuable. A breeders' registry has been set up in the United States to avoid any problems associated with inbreeding. As of 2020, 15 US states authorized the ownership of foxes without the need for a document, although one is also allowed. Due to inappropriate diet, captive foxes have been known to grow to abnormally large sizes.

Captive foxes have often been recorded exhibiting stereotyped behaviors; this may due to the insufficient environments they are placed in. When noises from zookeepers and visitors alike are produced, foxes often respond by pacing repeatedly. Similarly, in one case, two male individuals in the National Zoological Park spend the majority of their time pacing around their enclosures. Larger, outdoor enclosures may help reduce stereotyped behaviors, as they provide more space for foxes to flee from perceived danger and hide in a provided safe spot.
