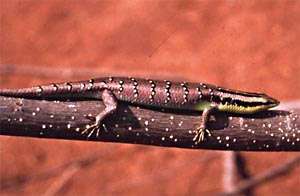

Conservation status
- Data Deficient (IUCN 3.1)

Scientific classification
- Kingdom: Animalia
- Phylum: Chordata
- Order: Squamata
- Family: Scincidae
- Genus: Dasia
- Species: D. johnsinghi

Binomial name
- Dasia johnsinghi Harikrishnan, Vasudevan, de Silva, Deepak, Kar, Naniwadekar, Lalremruata, Prasoona, & Aggarwal, 2012

= Dasia johnsinghi =

Species of lizard

Dasia johnsinghi, also known as the barred tree skink, is a species of skink endemic to India. It is currently known from the southern Western Ghats in Tamil Nadu.
