= Dasia nicobarensis =

Conservation status
- Data Deficient (IUCN 3.1)

Scientific classification
- Kingdom: Animalia
- Phylum: Chordata
- Class: Reptilia
- Order: Squamata
- Family: Scincidae
- Genus: Dasia
- Species: D. nicobarensis

Binomial name
- Dasia nicobarensis Biswas & Sanyal, 1977

Synonyms
- Dasia nicobariensis

Species of lizard

Dasia nicobarensis, the Nicobar tree skink or Nicobar dasia, is a species of arboreal skink found in the Nicobar Islands of India.

== Distribution ==
Types: ZSI 23211 (holotype), "Coconut grove, about 2 km S.W. of Teetop Guest House, Car Nicobar" (09°10′N; 92°47′E, in the Nicobar Islands, Bay of Bengal, India); ZSI 23212 (paratype), "Circuit House, Malacea (= Malacca), Car Nicobar" (in the Nicobar Islands, Bay of Bengal, India).

Dasia nicobarensis is known from the Nicobar Islands. Its presence in the Andaman Islands is uncertain.

== Description ==
The type series consists of two specimens of unspecified sex measuring 96–98 mm (3.8–3.9 in) in snout–vent length.
