= National symbols of Algeria =

Topic overview

The national symbols of Algeria are official and unofficial flags, icons or cultural expressions that are emblematic, representative or otherwise characteristic of Algeria and of its culture.

== Coats of arms ==
- Emblem of Algeria – adopted on 1 November 1976.
Current National Emblem of Algeria.

== Flags ==
- Flag of Algeria – adopted as the national flag on 3 July 1962. The current flag design is said to have first appeared in 1919 or 1934, depending on the source.
  - The national colours of the flag are green, red and white.

== National anthem ==
- Kassaman – the national anthem of Algeria; adopted on 5 July 1962, and declared an "immutable" symbol of the country in November 2008. The lyrics were written by Moufdi Zakaria c. April 1955–1956, and the musical composition was made by Mohamed Fawzi.

== National motto ==
- Motto of Algeria – By the people and for the people (Arabic: بالشعب و للشعب, romanized: Bil-shaʿb wa lil-shaʿb).

== Other national symbols ==
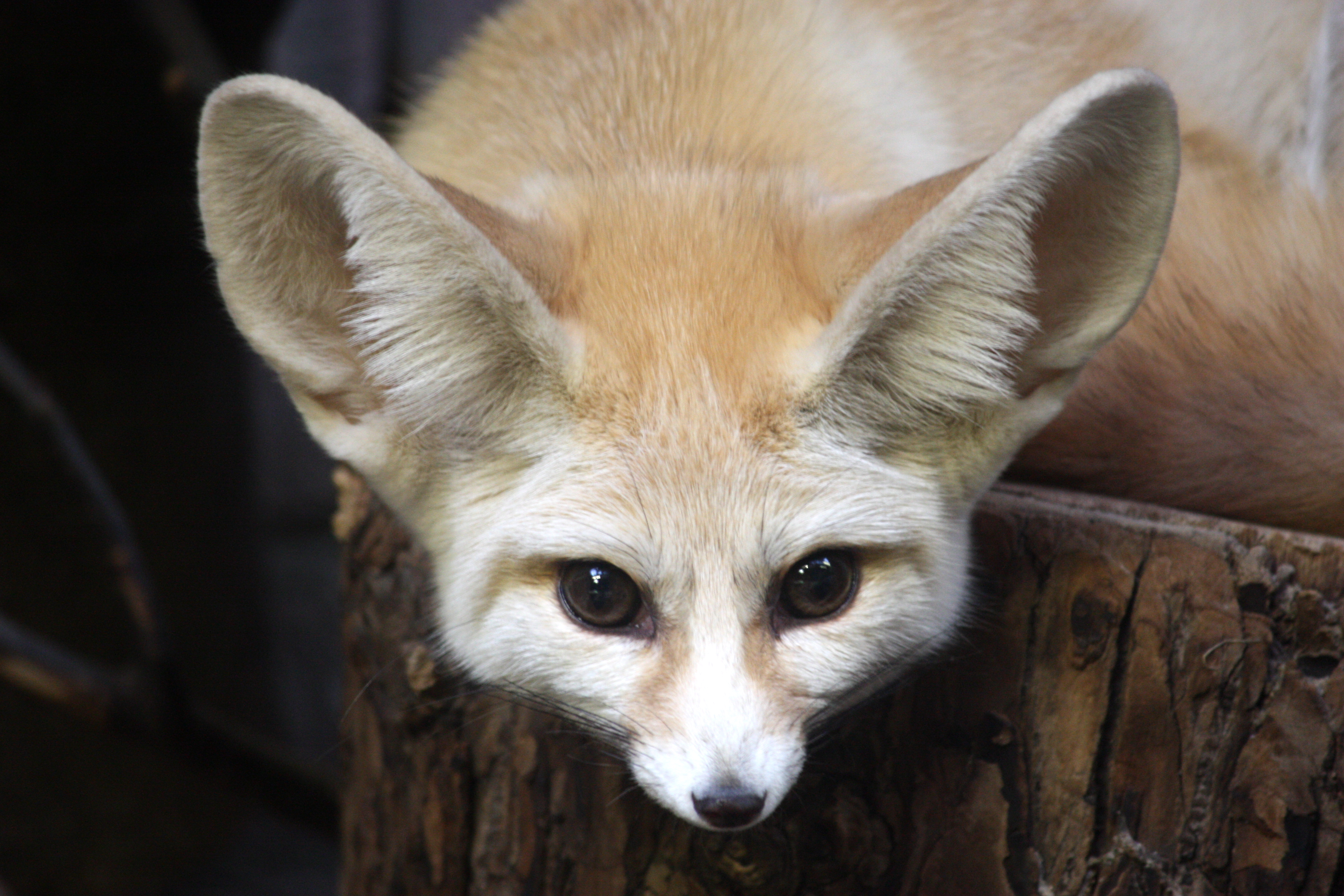
Fennec fox
(national animal)

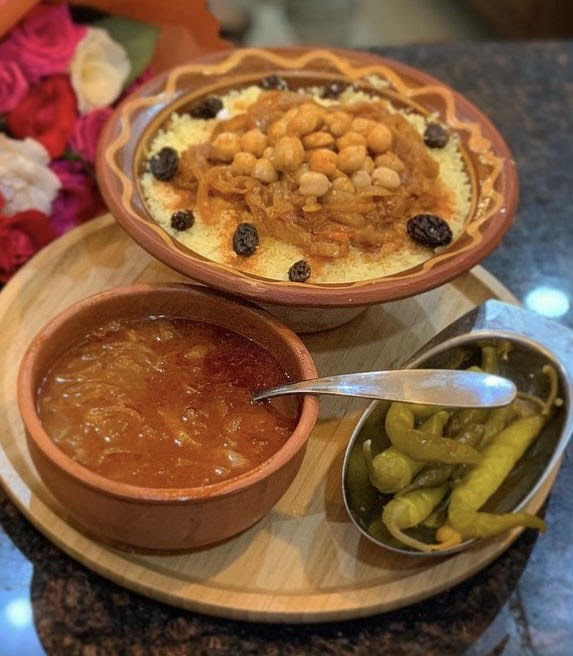
Couscous
(national food)

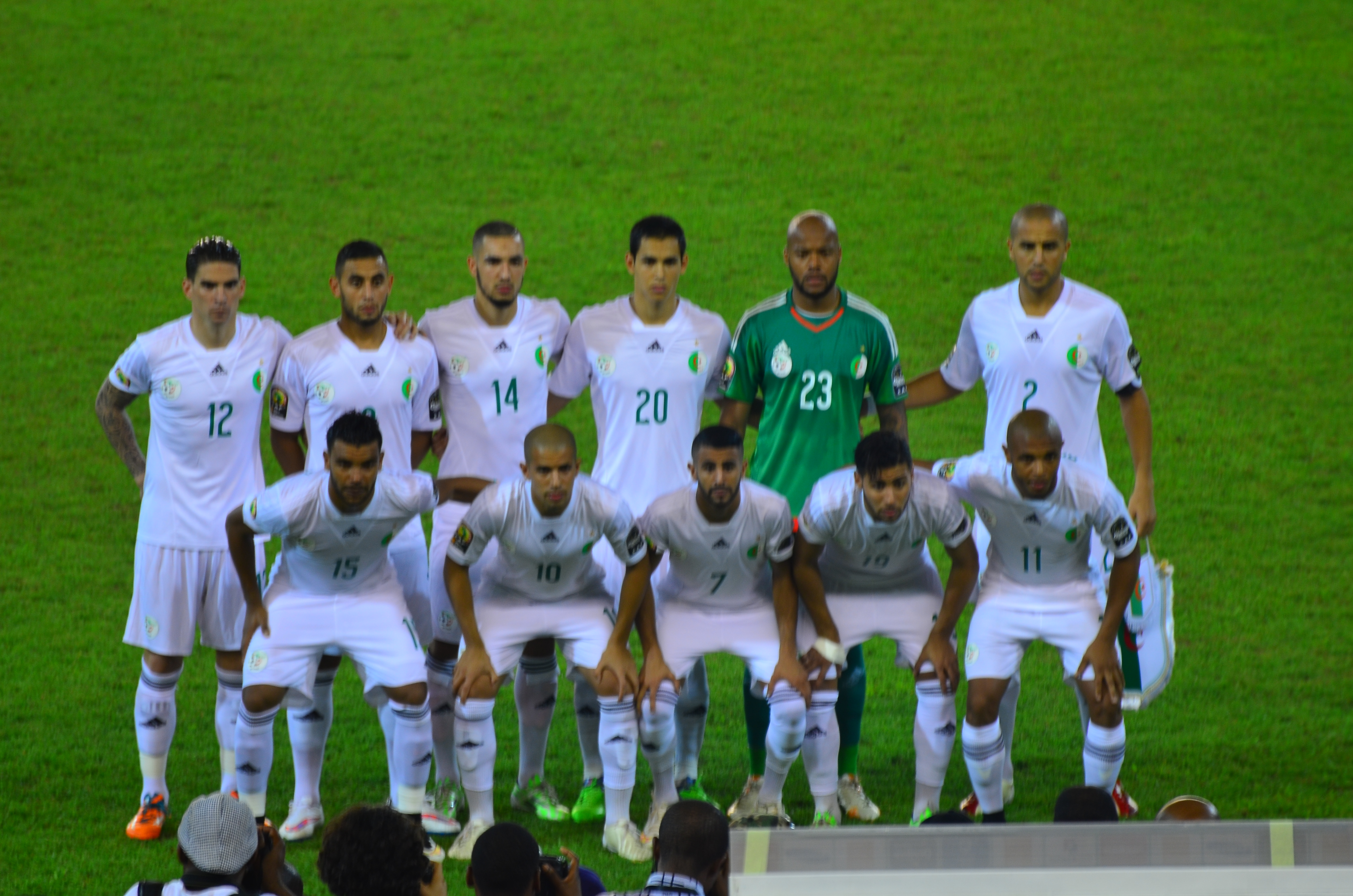
(The Fennec foxes)
(The Desert Warriors)
(national team)
