= Virginia Zoological Park =

Zoo in Norfolk, Virginia, United States

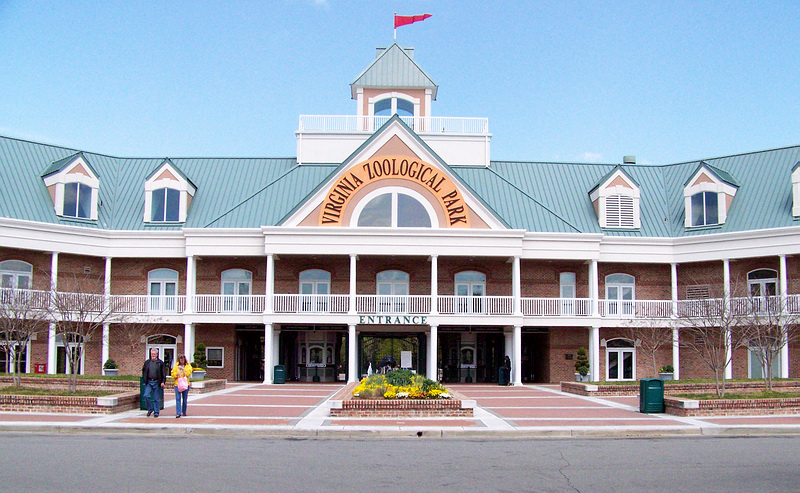
- Main Entrance
- Interactive map of Virginia Zoological Park
- 36.8786°N 76.2774°W
- Date opened: 1900
- Location: Norfolk, Virginia, United States
- Land area: 53 acres (21 ha)
- No. of animals: 700+
- No. of species: 150+
- Annual visitors: 500,000+
- Memberships: Association of Zoos and Aquariums
- Major exhibits: Trail of the Tiger, Okavango Delta, North America
- Website: www.virginiazoo.org

The Virginia Zoological Park, commonly known as the Virginia Zoo, is a 53-acre (21 ha) zoo located adjacent to Lafayette Park in Norfolk, Virginia, United States. The zoo opened in 1900, and was accredited by the Association of Zoos and Aquariums (AZA) in 1987.

== History ==
In 1892, the City of Norfolk purchased the 65 acres (26 ha) that was currently occupied by Lafayette Park. In 1900, the park began acquiring animals to exhibit, and by 1901 its collection exceeded 200 animals, including mammals, birds and reptiles.

In 1974, the facility was fenced off from the city park, and renamed Lafayette Zoological Park. Though fenced off, residents of the nearby LaValette Avenue could see the zoo's elephant exhibit from their homes. Newcomers, unfamiliar with the fact that a zoo was in the location, sometimes called the police at the sight of the elephants. Between 1974 and 1980, most of the zoo's old exhibits were renovated.

Also in 1974, the Friends of the Zoo was established to act as a support organization for the development of the zoo. In 1989, it was renamed as the Virginia Zoological Society and established as a non-profit organization.

In 1985, Lafayette Zoological Park was renamed the Virginia Zoological Park at Norfolk (commonly known as the Virginia Zoo). In 1987, the zoo gained accreditation from the Association of Zoos and Aquariums (AZA).

In 1992, a Master Plan was adopted by City of Norfolk and Virginia Zoological Society. Plans included a new Education Complex and Visitor Center, as well as African, North American, Australian, South American and Asian-themed exhibits. In 1999, Part I of Phase I opened, including Gelada baboon habitat and Xaxaba African village and 100th Anniversary of Virginia Zoo and Lafayette Park. In 2001, design for Master Plan Phase II: North America exhibit began. The following year Part II of Phase I opened: African Okavango Delta exhibit, thus completing Phase I of the Master Plan.

In 2004, Part I of Phase II opened: prairie dog habitat. The following year, the zoo got its third elephant named Cita. In 2011, Part I of Phase IV opened: "Trail of the Tiger" exhibit opened with various fauna of India and Southeast Asia. In 2008, the train, named The Norfolk Southern Express opened.

In 2016, the Zoo celebrated its 100th anniversary. The next year, two white rhinos arrived at the zoo.

In 2020, the Zoo was forced to close due to the COVID-19 pandemic. The Zoo launched an Emergency Operations Fund to aid in financial impact due to the closure.

In June 2020, the Zoo reopened to the public with modifications and a new schedule.

== Exhibits ==
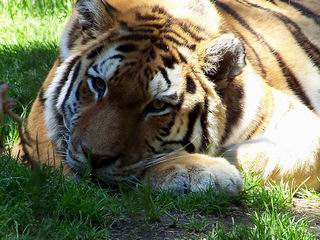
Tiger at Trail of the Tiger exhibit.

Trail of the Tiger

This exhibit was opened in 2011. It features animals from Asia, and nearly doubles the number of large animals at the zoo. Among the animals in this exhibit are Malayan tigers, oriental small-clawed otters, Bornean orangutans, Siamangs, Northern white-cheeked gibbons, Malayan tapirs, Binturongs, Red pandas, Southern Cassowaries, Sarus Cranes, Rhinoceros hornbills, Asian fairy-bluebirds, azure-winged magpies, and chestnut-breasted malkoha. The exhibit includes a raised boardwalk over the "Asian forest", and a cave with views into the tiger and orangutan exhibits. Another viewing area allows underwater views of the otters and tigers.

Okavango Delta

Named after the real life Okavango Delta in Africa, this exhibit opened in 2002. The animals here include Masai giraffes, Hartmann's mountain zebras, white rhinoceros, African lions, cheetahs, meerkats, Ankole-Watusi, eastern bongoes, yellow-backed duikers, red river hogs, ostriches, southern ground hornbills, Aldabra giant tortoises, Meller's chameleons and a few other reptiles.

North America

Three exhibits house American bison, black-tailed prairie dogs and a rescued bald eagle. Outside of the exhibits is an oyster restoration pond and a pond for wild birds.

== Gallery ==
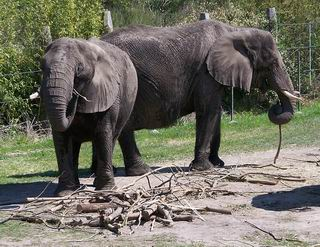
Elephants

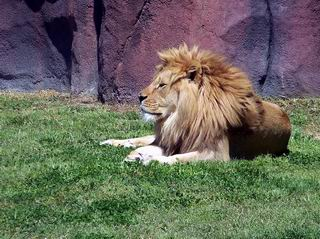
Lion

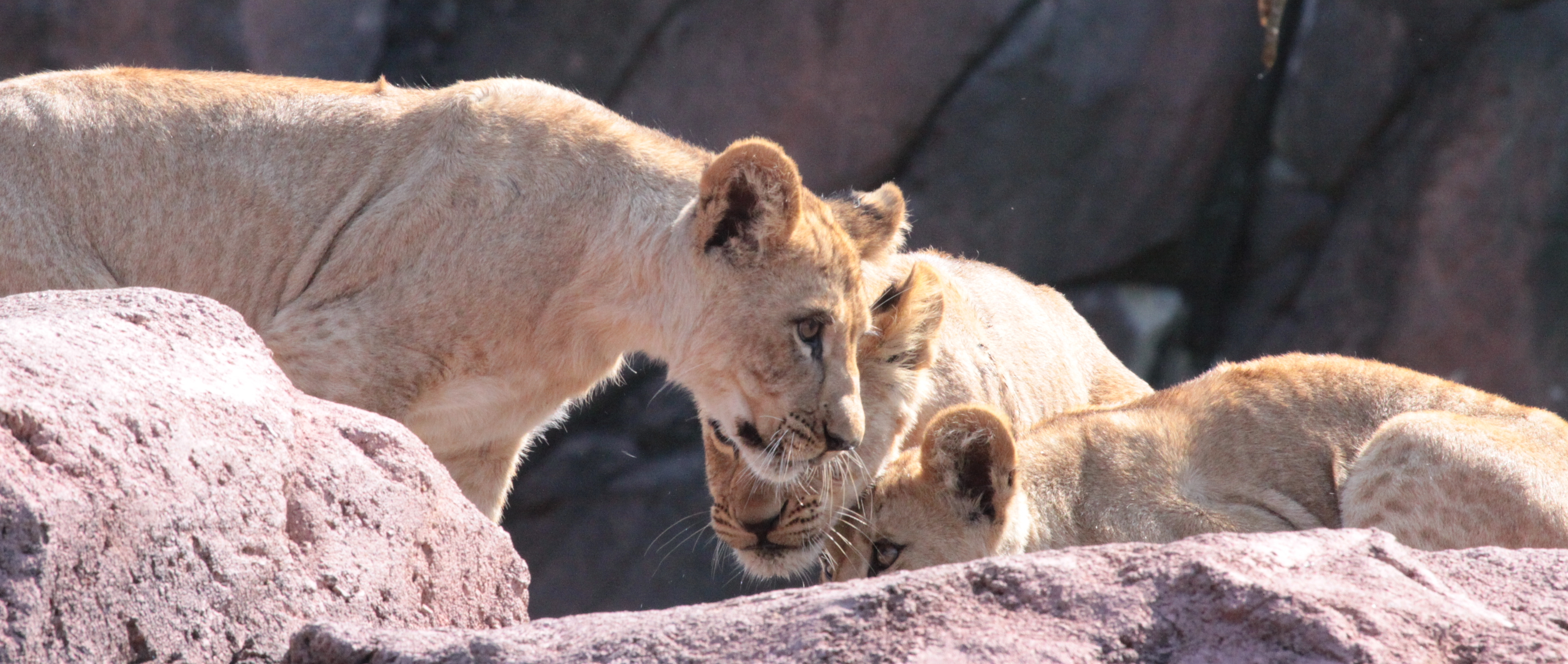
African lion cubs

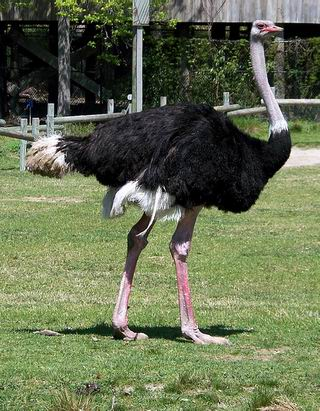
Ostrich

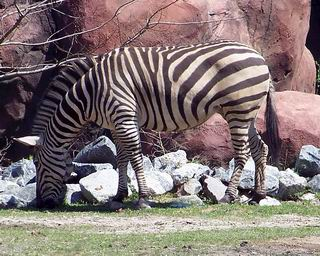
Grant's zebra (Equus quagga boehmi)

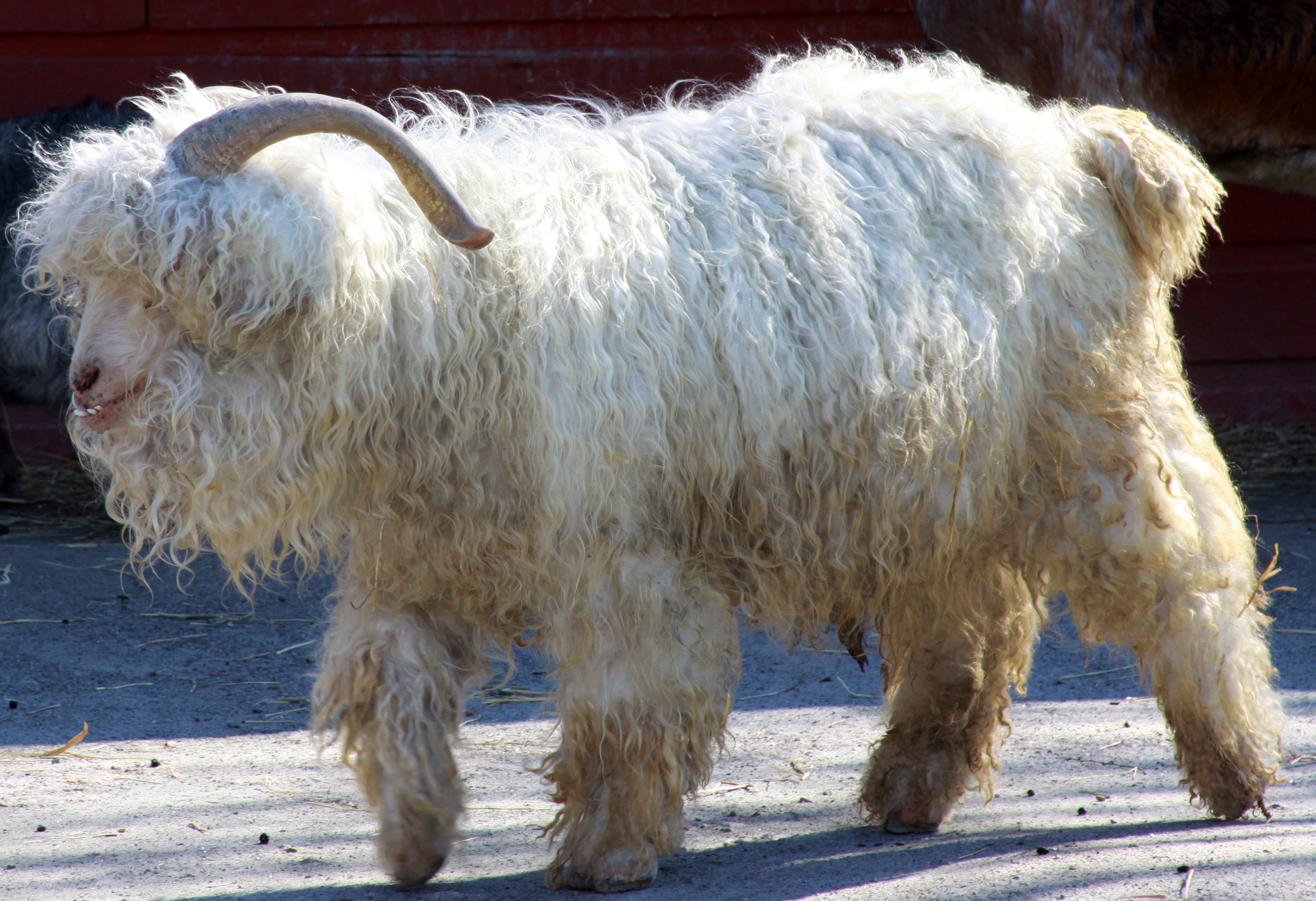
Angora goat

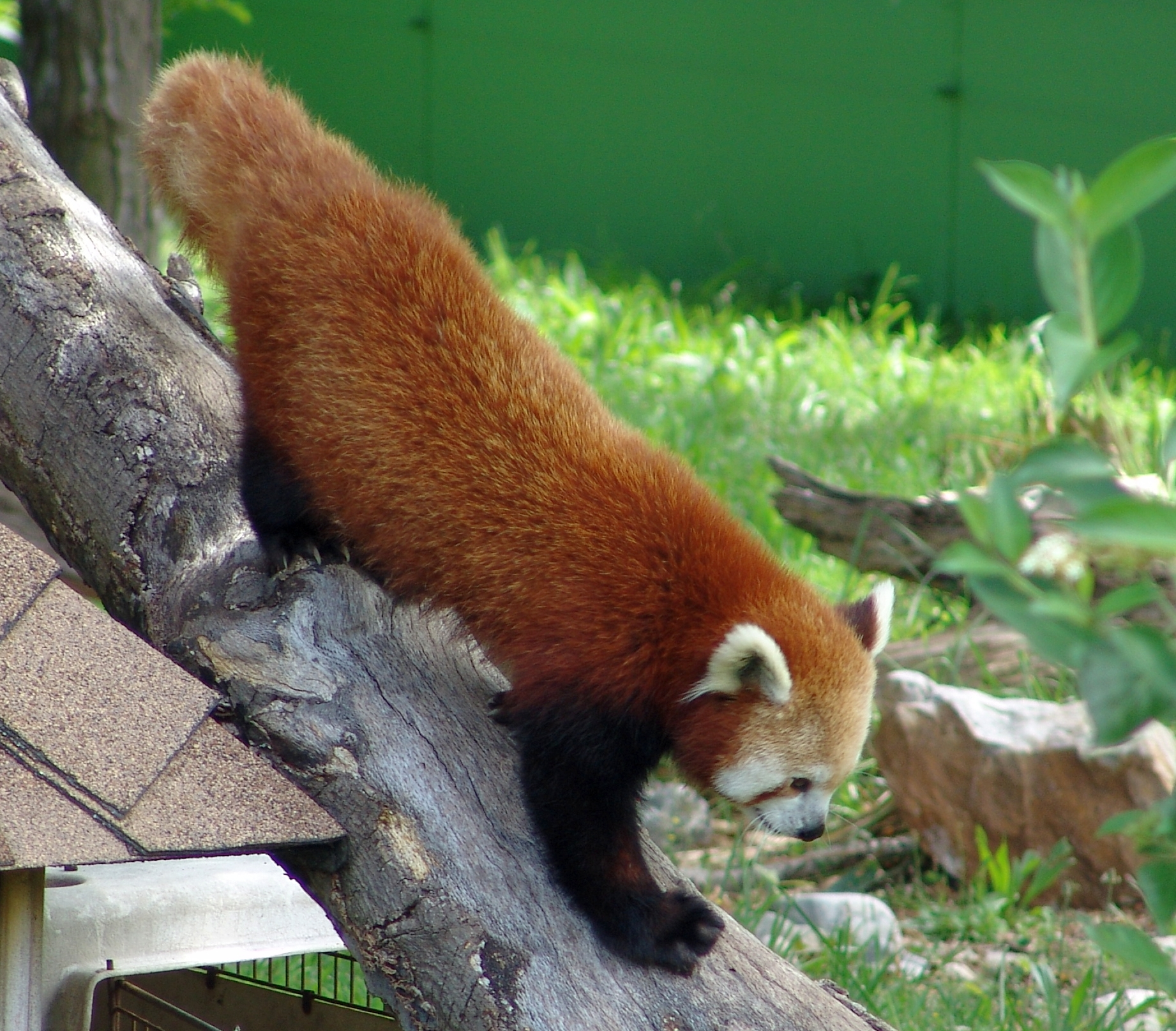
Red panda (Ailurus fulgens)

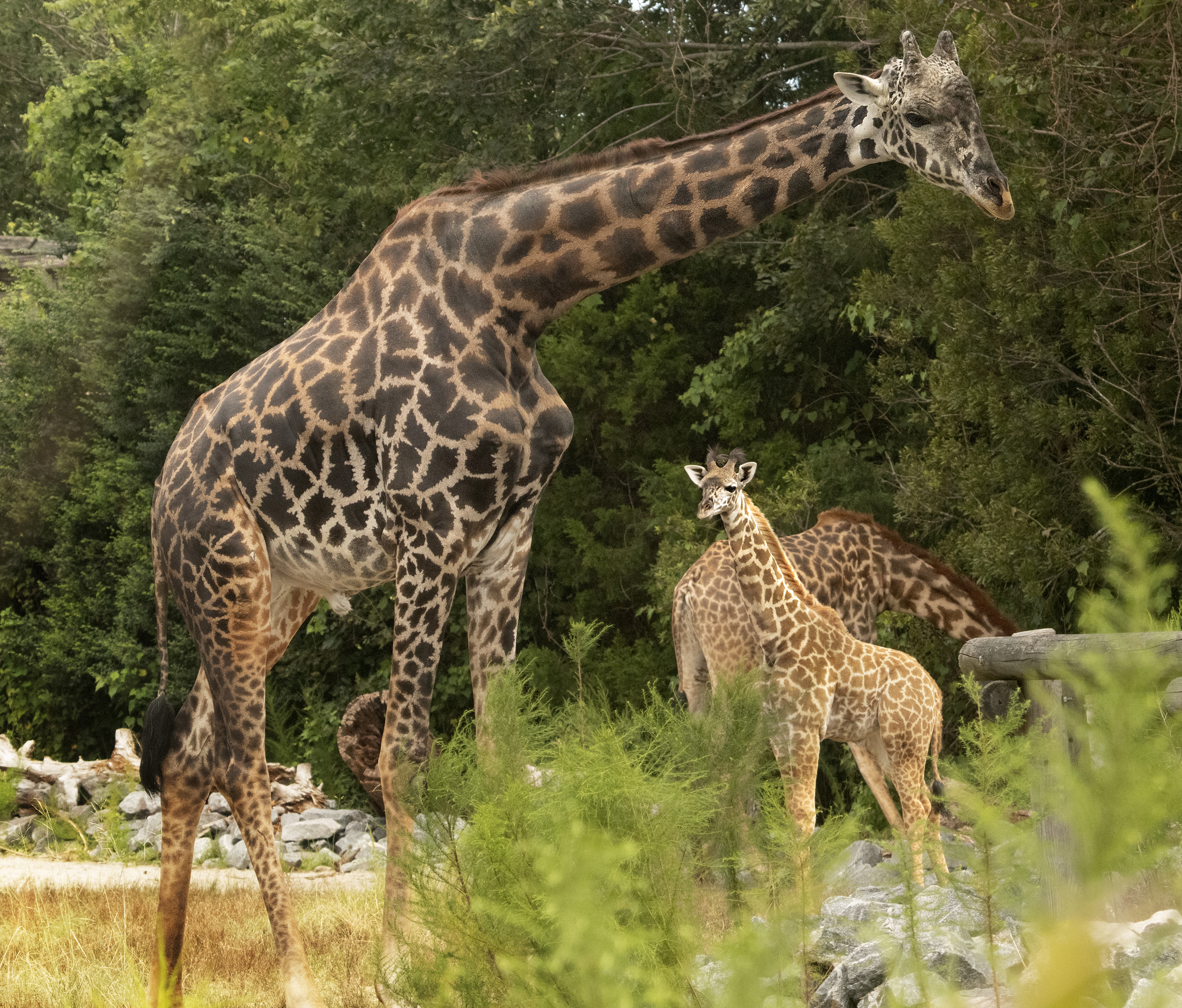
Giraffes

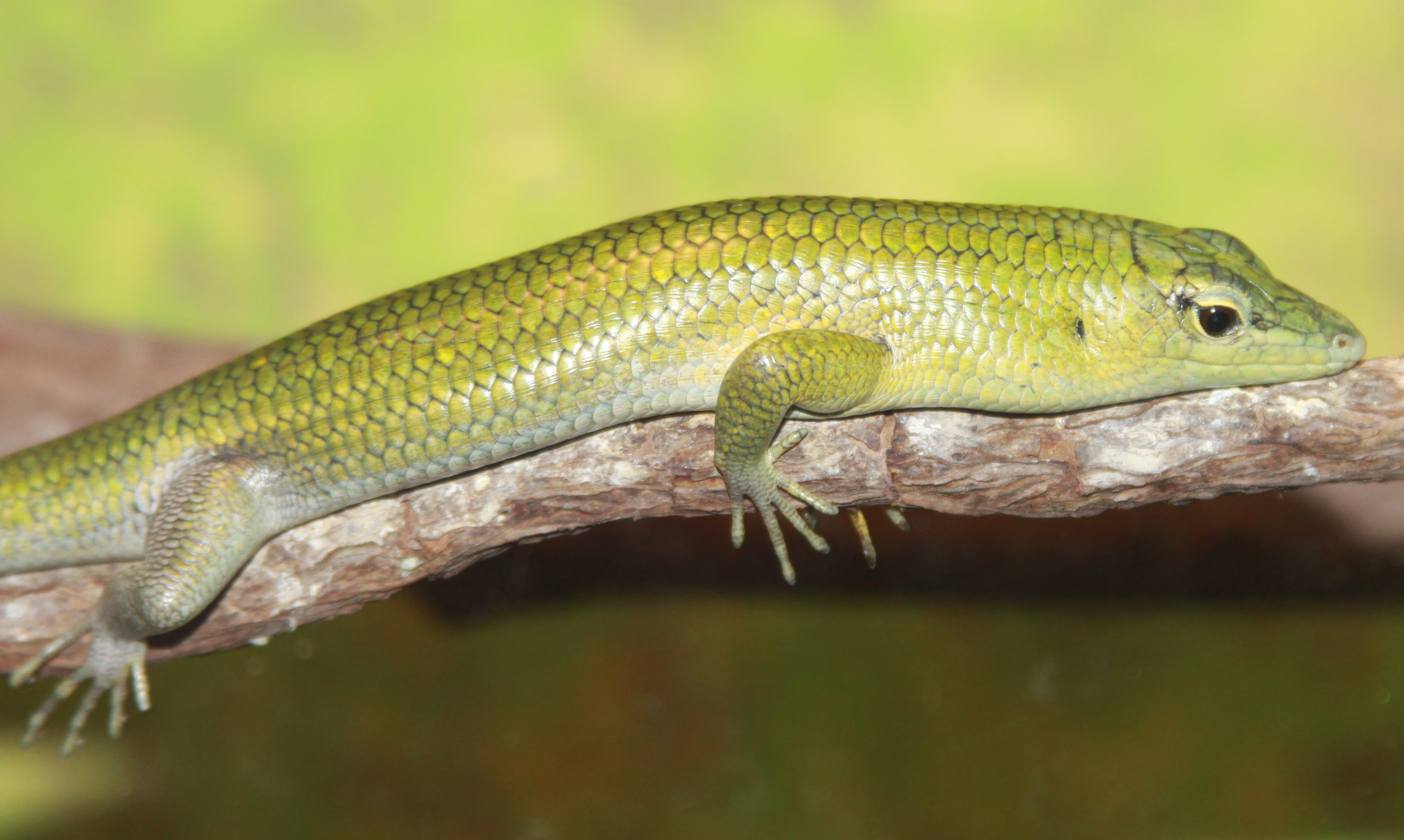
Dasia lizard

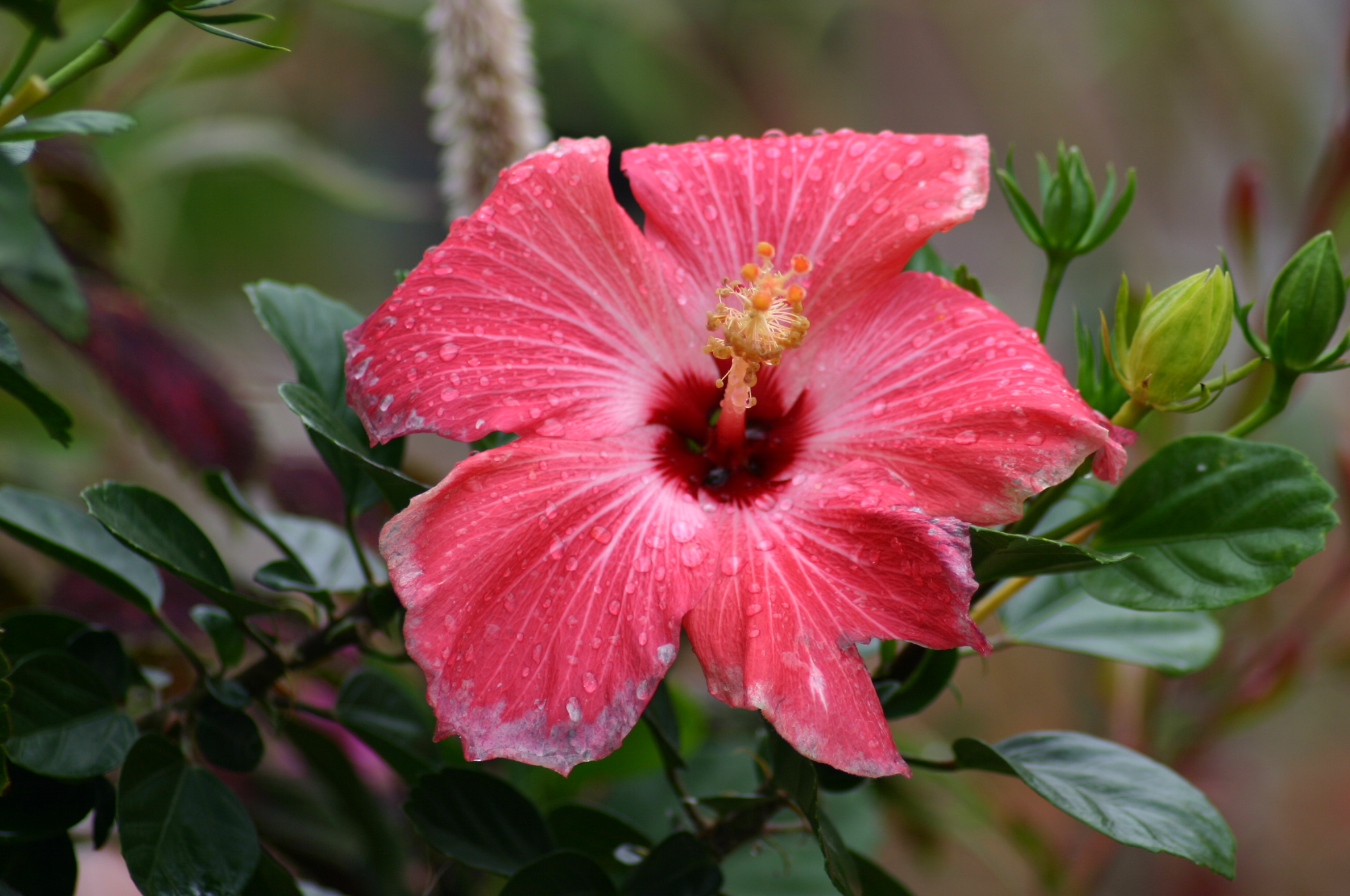
One of the many flowering plants at the zoo
