= Hemidactylus pieresii =

Scientific classification
- Kingdom: Animalia
- Phylum: Chordata
- Class: Reptilia
- Order: Squamata
- Suborder: Gekkota
- Family: Gekkonidae
- Genus: Hemidactylus
- Species: H. pieresii

Binomial name
- Hemidactylus pieresii Kelaart, 1852

Species of lizard

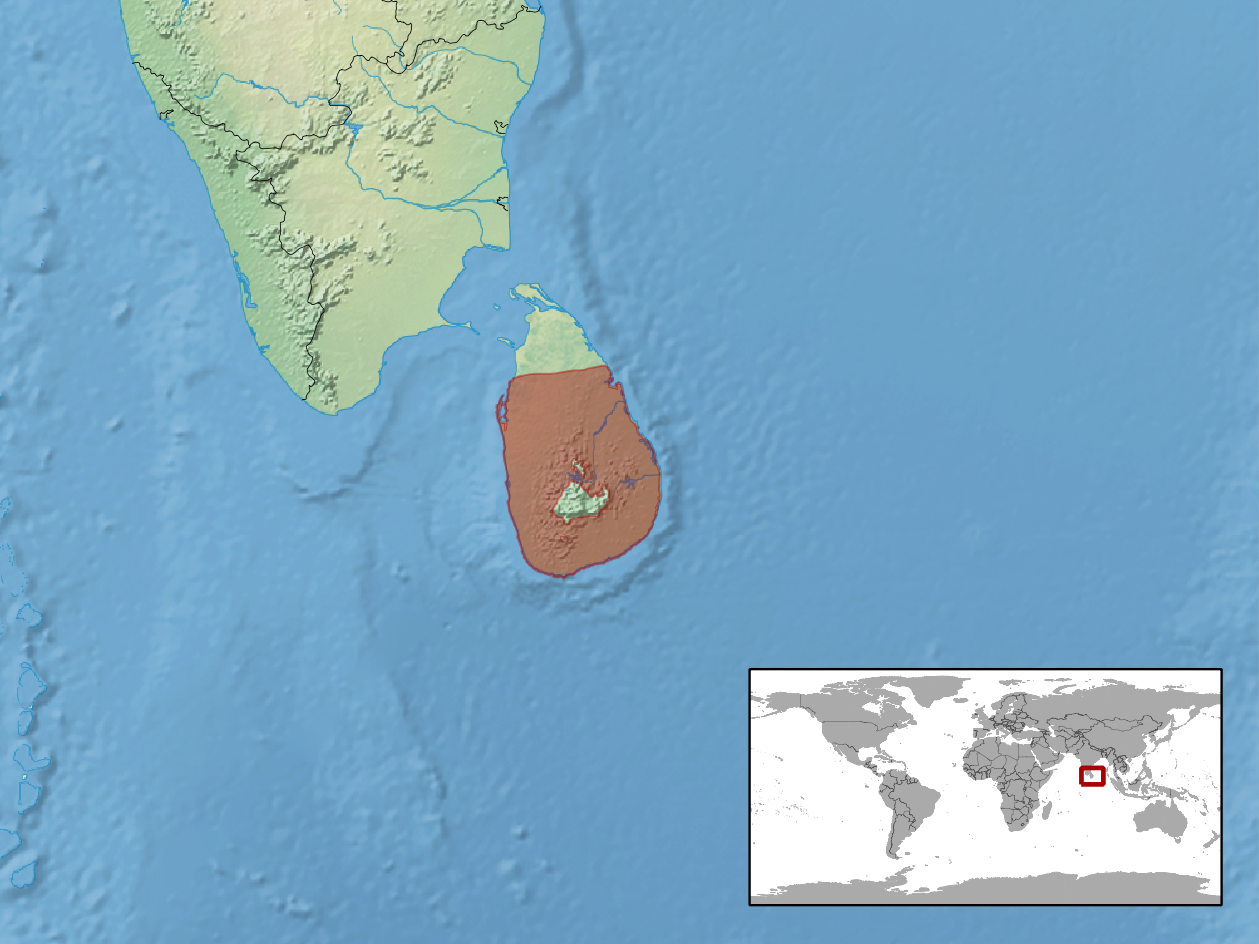
geographic distribution of Hemidactylus depressus (native region in colour)

Hemidactylus pieresii is a species of gecko. It is endemic to Sri Lanka.

== Taxonomy ==
It was synonymized with Hemidactylus depressus by Smith in 1935 but removed from the synonymy by Batuwita & Pethiyagoda in 2012.

== Distribution ==
It is endemic to Sri Lanka and found in Kandy, Hiniduma, Yattapatha, Pitadeniya, Sinaharaja, Kalugala and Gannoruwa areas.

== Description ==
Maximum snout-vent length is 79.2 mm. Body moderately elongate, relatively robust. Body chocolate brown. Fore limbs and hind limbs are relatively short and stout. Nape with distinct black longitudinal stripes. Venter is dusky white. There is a yellow lateral band runs from snout to back of head. Presence of 53–58 para-vertebral tubercles, 17–19 longitudinal rows of mid-dorsal tubercles, small and closely spaced mid-dorsal tubercles. Ventral and sub-caudal scales are smooth. Digits relatively short and all bearing claws. Tail has strongly keeled tubercles which are arranged in whorls. Cloacal spur with two enlarged tubercles.
