= Dasia grisea =

Conservation status
- Least Concern (IUCN 3.1)

Scientific classification
- Kingdom: Animalia
- Phylum: Chordata
- Class: Reptilia
- Order: Squamata
- Family: Scincidae
- Genus: Dasia
- Species: D. grisea

Binomial name
- Dasia grisea (Gray, 1845)

Species of lizard

Dasia grisea, also known as the gray dasia, big tree skink, or gray tree skink, is a species of skink found in Malaysia, Singapore, Indonesia, and the Philippines.
