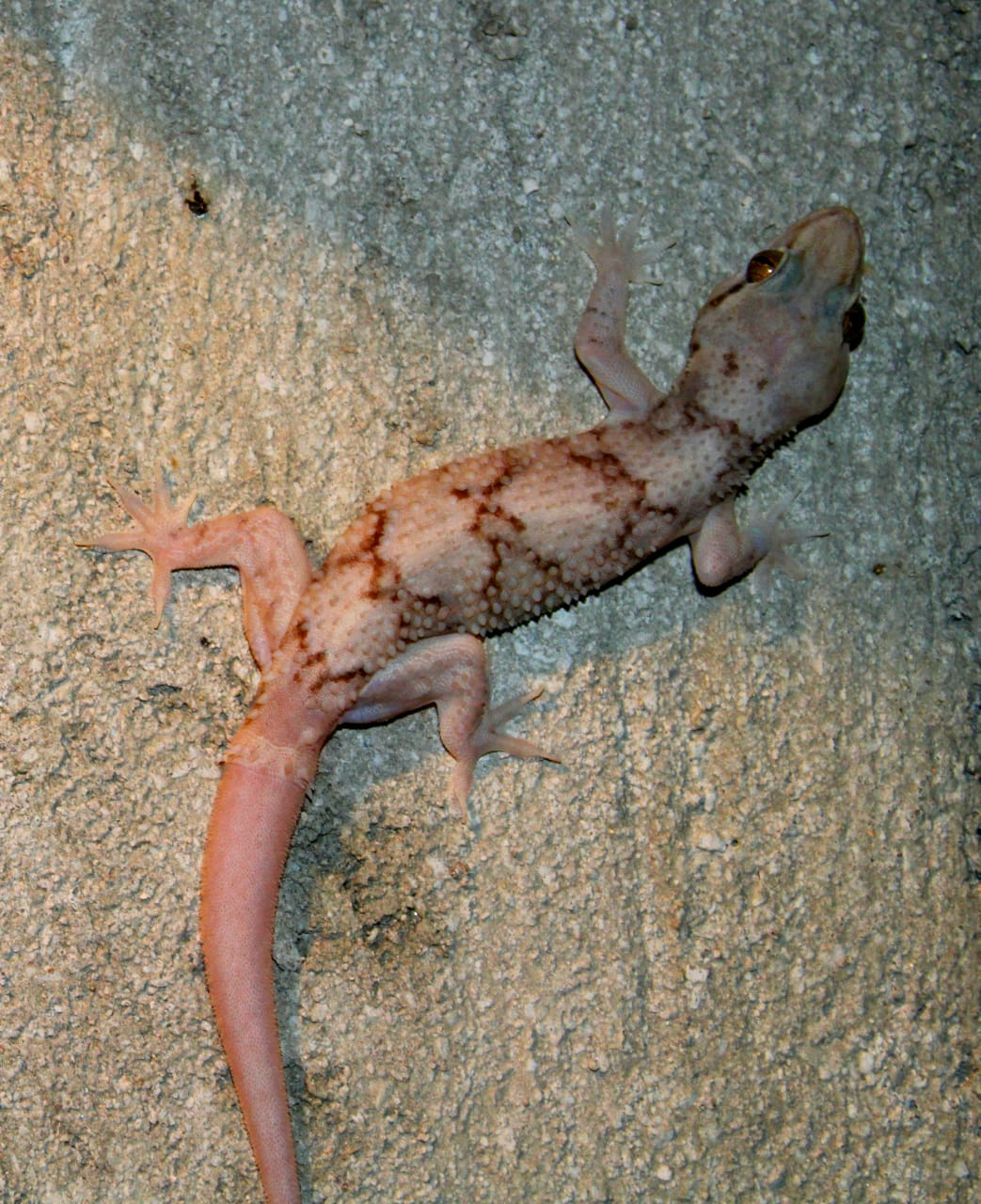

Conservation status
- Least Concern (IUCN 3.1)

Scientific classification
- Kingdom: Animalia
- Phylum: Chordata
- Class: Reptilia
- Order: Squamata
- Suborder: Gekkota
- Family: Gekkonidae
- Genus: Hemidactylus
- Species: H. depressus

Binomial name
- Hemidactylus depressus Gray, 1842
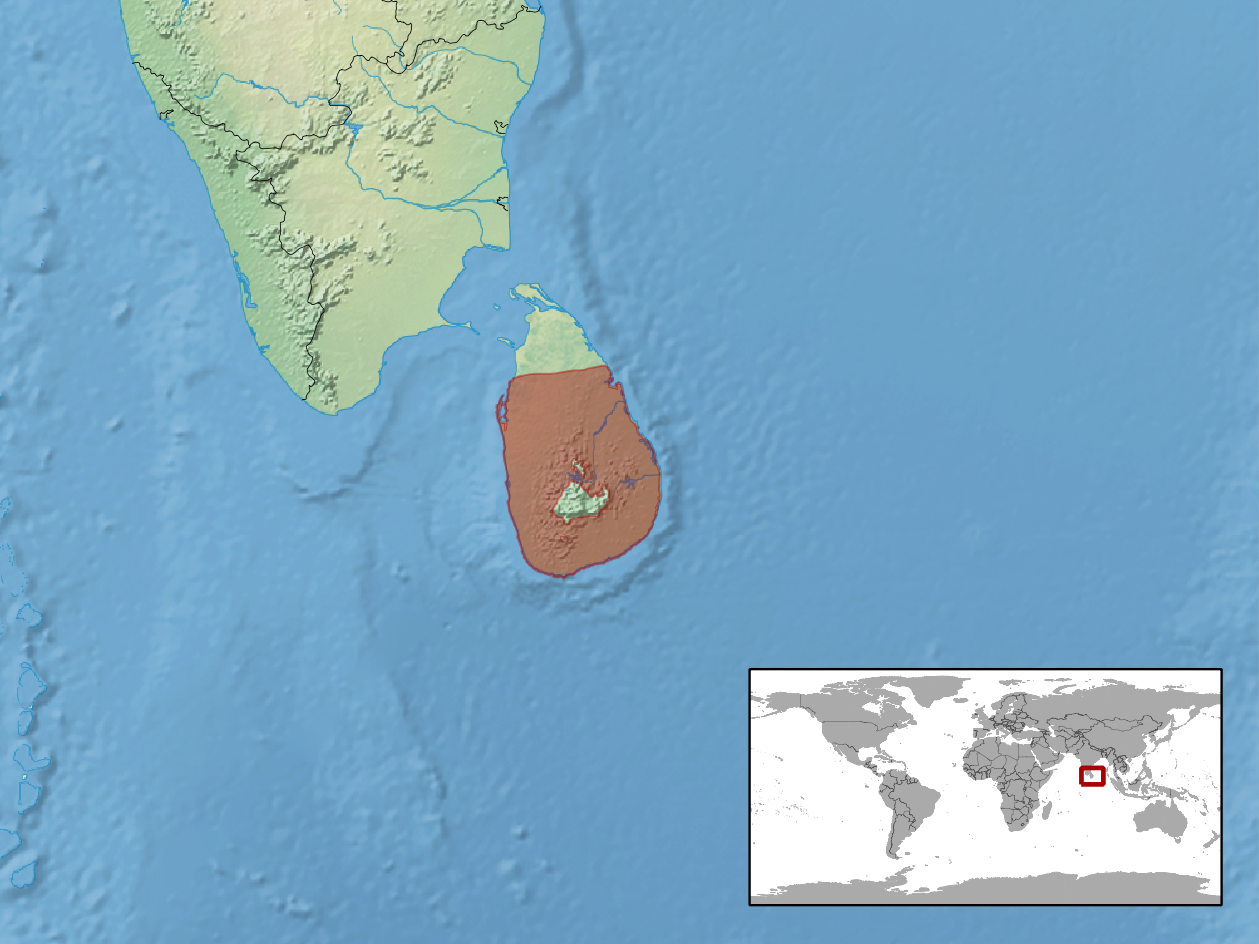

Synonyms
- Nubilia argentii Gray, 1845

= Hemidactylus depressus =

Species of lizard

Hemidactylus depressus, also known as Sri Lanka leaf-nosed gecko or Kandyan gecko, is a species of gecko endemic to island of Sri Lanka.

== Description ==
Head large with large granules, especially on snout. Mid-ventrals 36–40. Digits webbed at base. Lamellae under fourth toe counts 10–11. Tail depressed, with serrated lateral edges. Dorsum light brown to gray, with 4-5 dark transverse angular markings. A dark canthal stripe, edged with a pale one. Tail is with dark cross bars. Venter grayish-creamy.

== Distribution and habitat ==
A gecko endemic to Sri Lanka, found only from localities Kantale, Giritale, Mankulam, Alutnuwara, Hunugalla, Elkaduwa, Matale, Rattota, Gammaduwa, Kandy, Knuckles Mountain Range, Haragama, Wakwalla, Palatupana, Balangoda and Vanathavilluwa.

== Ecology and diet ==
Arboreal species from the plains, found on trees, boulders and caves and sometimes enter houses. Diet comprises insects.

== Reproduction ==
Lay 2 eggs at a time in rock crevices, tree holes, leaf litter between June–August. Hatchlings emerge during August and September.
