= Haragama =

Coordinates: 7°16′N 80°43′E

හාරගම ஹாரகம HARAGAMA
- Village
- Interactive map of හාරගම
- Country: Sri Lanka
- Province: Central Province
- Time zone: UTC+5:30 (Sri Lanka Standard Time)

Haragama is a very rural village in Sri Lanka. It is located within Central Province. This village is very near to Maiyangana district. (Dry zone in Sri Lanka) You can find many wild elephants and cows in this area.

== See also ==
- List of towns in Central Province, Sri Lanka
