= Calotes desilvai =

Conservation status
- Critically Endangered (IUCN 3.1)

Scientific classification
- Kingdom: Animalia
- Phylum: Chordata
- Class: Reptilia
- Order: Squamata
- Suborder: Iguania
- Family: Agamidae
- Genus: Calotes
- Species: C. desilvai

Binomial name
- Calotes desilvai Bahir & Maduwage, 2005

Species of lizard

Calotes desilvai, commonly known as the Morningside lizard, or the Ceylon black-band whistling lizard, is a species of lizard in the family Agamidae. Calotes desilvai is one of seven Calotes species endemic to Sri Lanka.

== Etymology ==
The specific name, desilvai, is in honor of Sri Lankan herpetologist Anslem de Silva.

== Habitat ==
The preferred natural habitat of C. desilvai is forest, at altitudes up to 1,080 m (3,540 ft).

== Description ==
C. desilvai has the following characteristics. The bands on the gular area are black. The shoulder pit is black. The scales on the ventral surface of the thigh are smooth.

== Behavior ==
C. desilvai is arboreal and diurnal.

== Reproduction ==
C. desilvai is oviparous.
