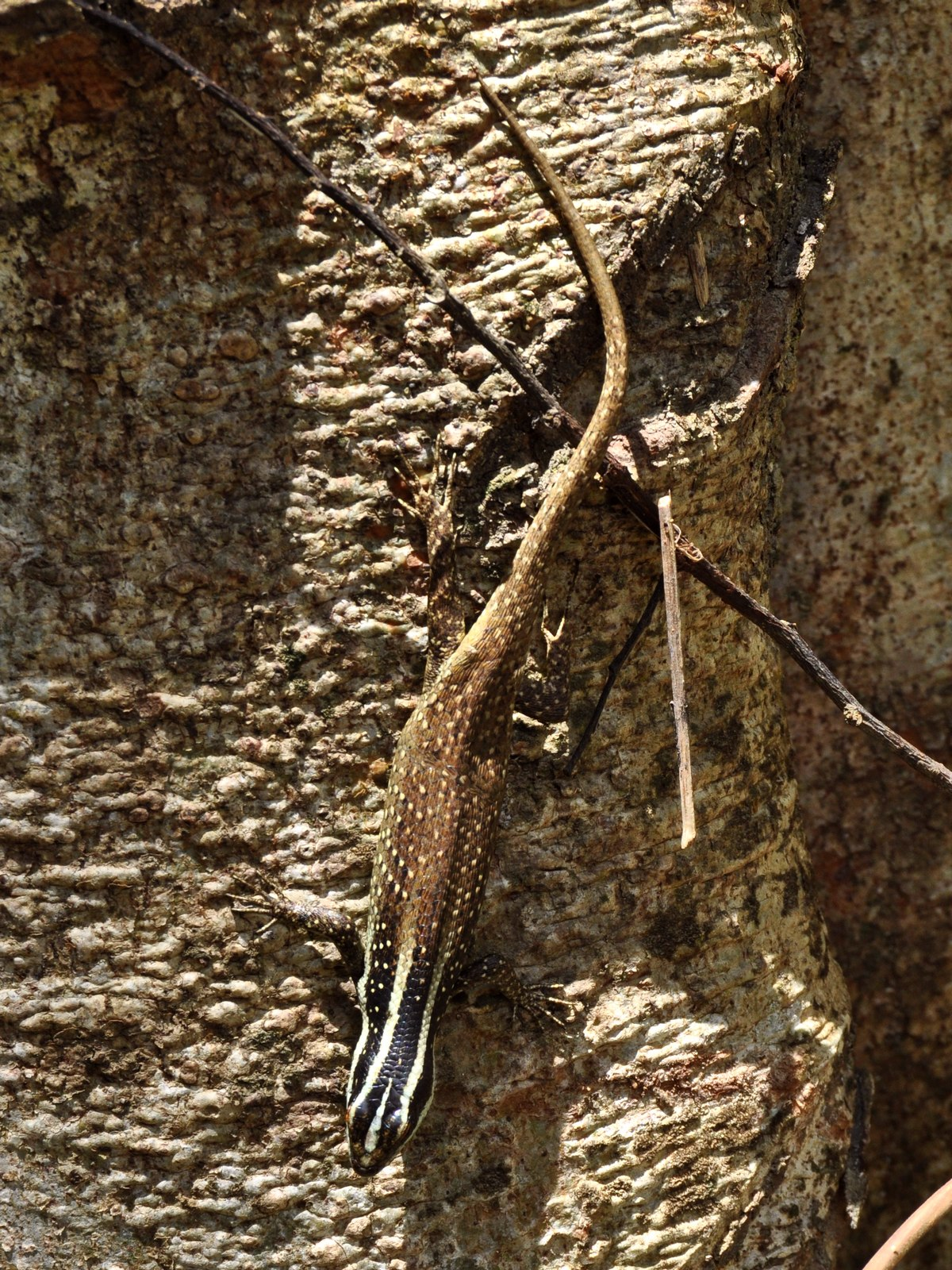
- Dasia vittata from Berau Regency, East Kalimantan, Indonesia

Conservation status
- Least Concern (IUCN 3.1)

Scientific classification
- Kingdom: Animalia
- Phylum: Chordata
- Class: Reptilia
- Order: Squamata
- Family: Scincidae
- Genus: Dasia
- Species: D. vittata

Binomial name
- Dasia vittata (Edeling, 1865)

Synonyms
- Apterygodon vittatum Edeling, 1865; Apterygodon vittatus – Bauer et al., 2003; Dasia vittatum – Auliya, 2006; Euprepes praeornatus Peters, 1871; Lygosoma vittatum – Boulenger, 1887

= Dasia vittata =

Species of lizard

Dasia vittata, the Borneo skink or striped tree skink, is a species of lizard endemic to Borneo. It is oviparous and arboreal.
