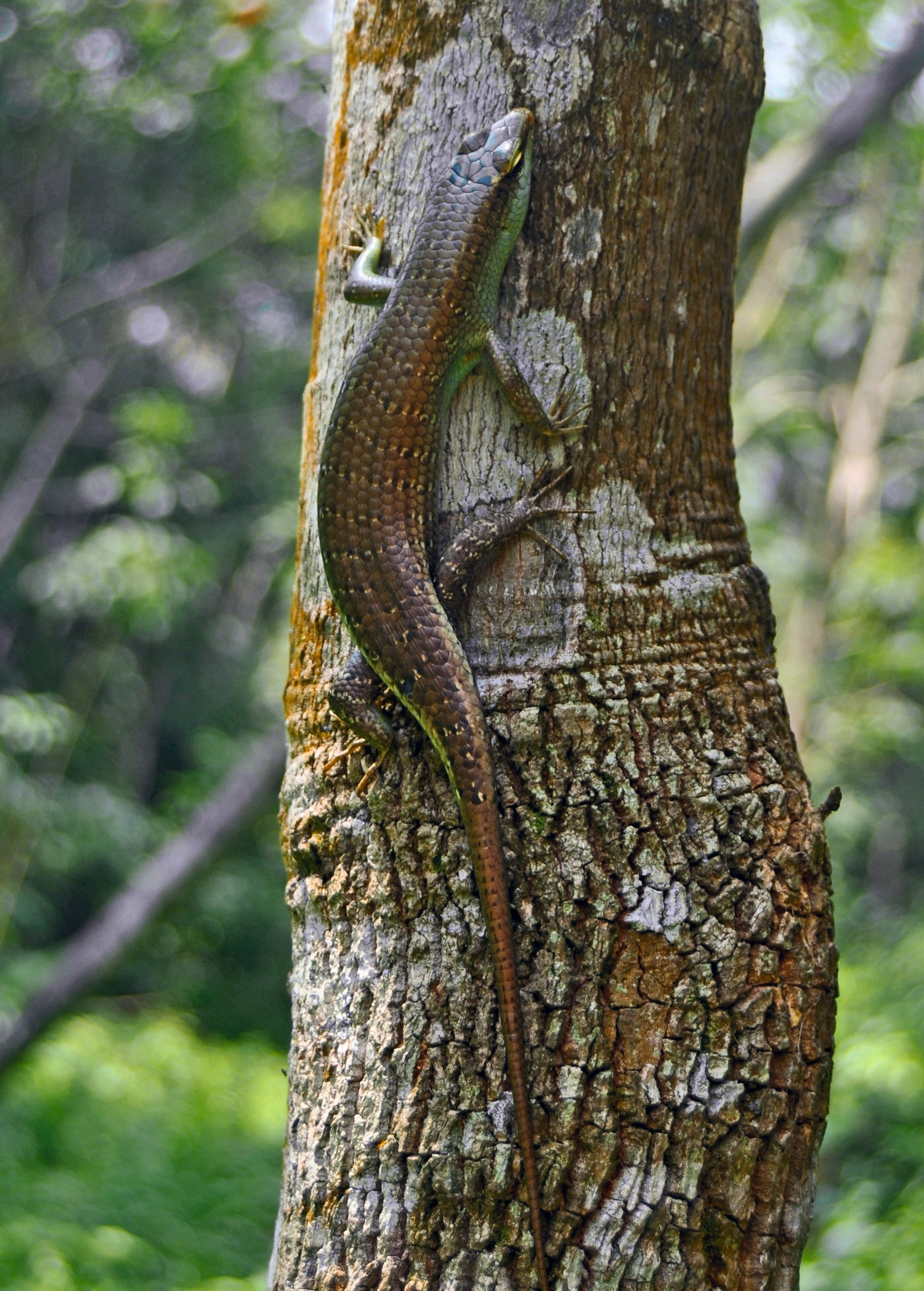

Conservation status
- Least Concern (IUCN 3.1)

Scientific classification
- Kingdom: Animalia
- Phylum: Chordata
- Class: Reptilia
- Order: Squamata
- Family: Scincidae
- Genus: Dasia
- Species: D. olivacea

Binomial name
- Dasia olivacea Gray, 1839
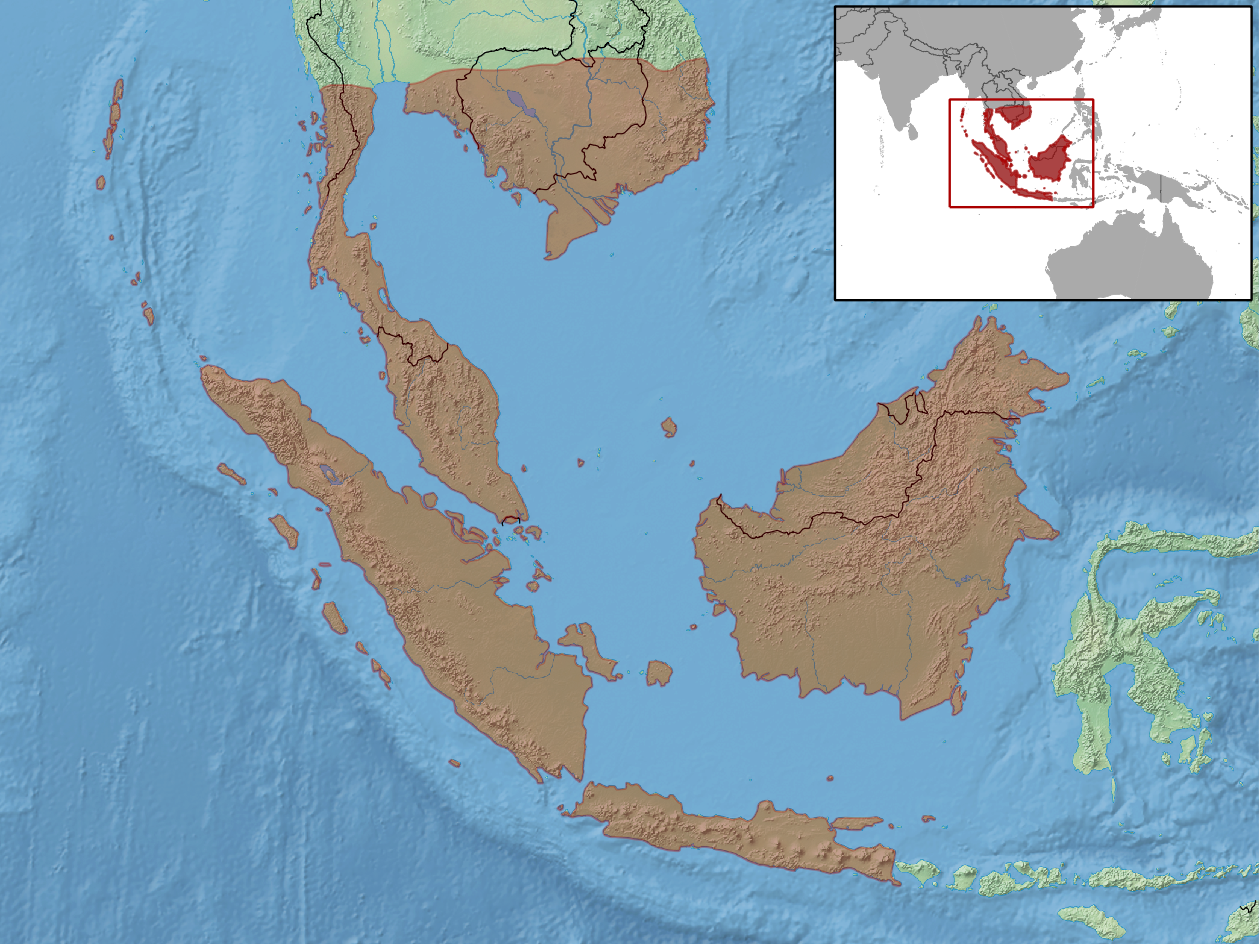

Synonyms
- Euprepes ernesti Duméril & Bibron, 1839; Eurepes olivaceus (Gray, 1839); Lygosoma olivaceum (Gray, 1839); Mabuia saravacensis Bartlett, 1895; Tiliqua olivacea (Gray, 1839)

= Dasia olivacea =

Species of lizard

Dasia olivacea, the olive dasia or olive tree skink, is a semi-arboreal species of skink lizard native to Southeast Asia.

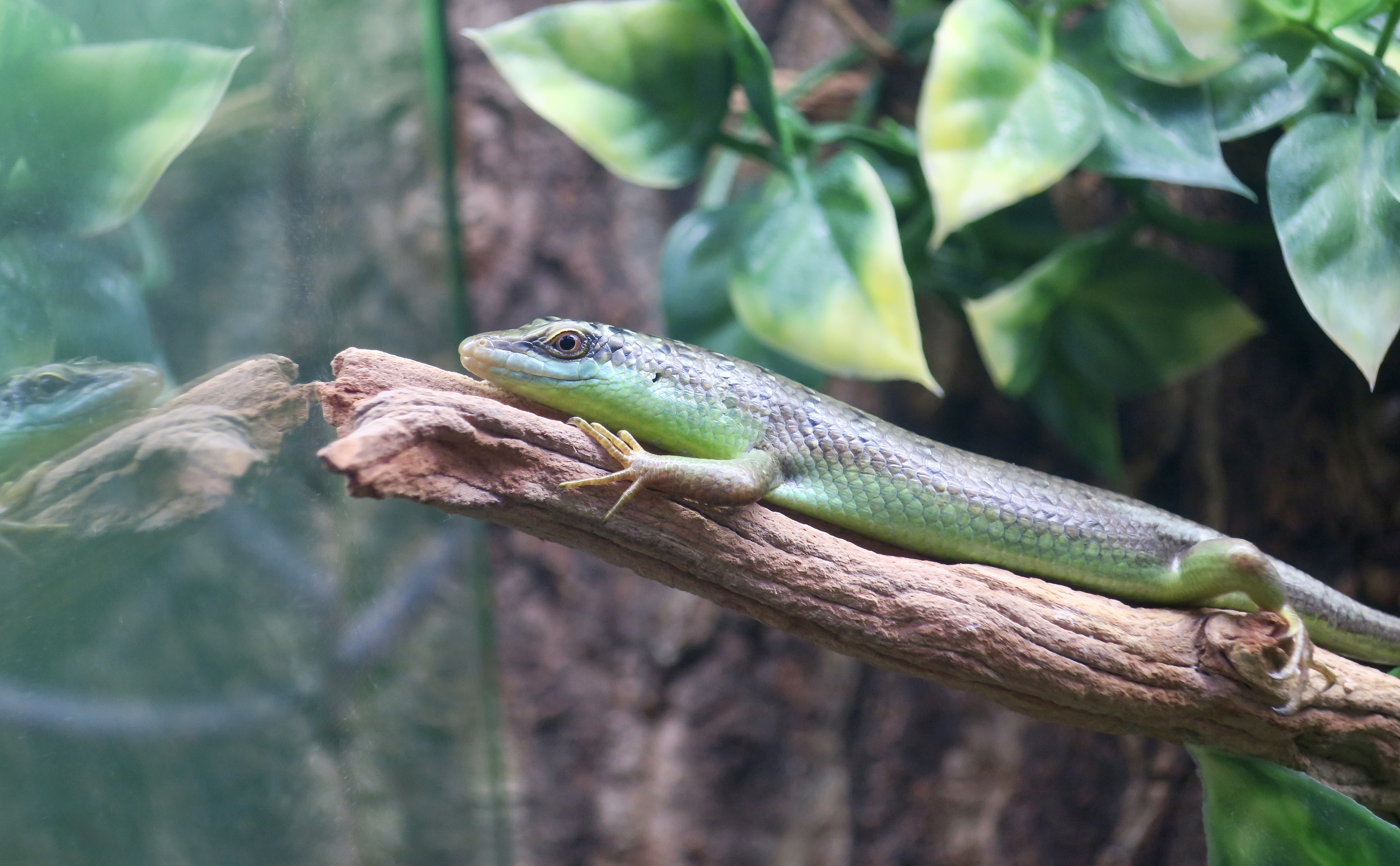
At LLL Reptiles, a reptile store in Henderson, Nevada.

== Distribution ==
Dasia olivacea is found south of approximately 15° north in Southeast Asia, including parts of Laos, Malaysia, Myanmar, Thailand, Singapore, Vietnam, throughout the island of Borneo (Sarawak, Kalimantan, Brunei), the Indonesian islands of Bali, Java and Sumatra (among others), as well as India's Andaman and Nicobar Islands.

The species is originally known from a single locality in Cambodia. The northernmost extreme for D. olivacea is possibly the Sakaerat Environmental Research Station in the Nakhon Ratchasima Province of eastern Thailand.

== Ecology and conservation ==
Dasia olivacea lives almost exclusively in trees, only rarely descending to nest or to move between trees. Eggs may be laid more than once per year, in clutches of up to 14 eggs; incubation lasts 69 days. Because it is very widespread and ecologically flexible, D. olivacea is considered to be a species of Least Concern on the IUCN Red List.

== Taxonomy ==
Dasia olivacea was first described by John Edward Gray, in a publication of the Annals of Natural History (1839), as the type species of the (then) newly-discovered genus Dasia. The type locality was "Prince of Wales Island" (now Penang Island).

== Description ==
Mature individuals of Dasia olivacea have a green back, with bronze scales towards the flanks and 12 bands of ocelli (eye-like spots) reaching from side to side. The head is primarily a dark olive-green colour with black markings; the underside of the head is a bluish to yellowish green.
