= Dasia semicincta =

Conservation status
- Data Deficient (IUCN 3.1)

Scientific classification
- Kingdom: Animalia
- Phylum: Chordata
- Class: Reptilia
- Order: Squamata
- Family: Scincidae
- Genus: Dasia
- Species: D. semicincta

Binomial name
- Dasia semicincta (Peters, 1867)

Synonyms
- Euprepes (Tiliqua) semicinctus Peters, 1867

Species of lizard

Dasia semicincta, also known as southern keel-scaled tree skink and Peters' dasia, is a species of skink found in Mindanao, the Philippines (possibly wider) and in Sarawak, Borneo (Malaysia).
