= Dasia vyneri =

Conservation status
- Least Concern (IUCN 3.1)

Scientific classification
- Kingdom: Animalia
- Phylum: Chordata
- Class: Reptilia
- Order: Squamata
- Family: Scincidae
- Genus: Dasia
- Species: D. vyneri

Binomial name
- Dasia vyneri (Shelford, 1905)

Synonyms
- Lygosoma (Keneuxia) vyneri Shelford, 1905; Lamprolepis vyneri — Greer, 1970; Dasia vyneri — M.A. Smith, 1937

Species of lizard

Dasia vyneri, also known commonly as Shelford's skink and Vyner's tree skink, is a species of lizard in the family Scincidae. The species is native to Southeast Asia.

== Etymology ==
The specific name, vyneri, is in honor of Charles Vyner de Windt Brooke, who was to become the last White Raja of Sarawak.

== Geographic range ==
Dasia vyneri is known only from Sarawak, Malaysia.

== Habitat ==
The preferred natural habitat of D. vyneri is forest.

== Description ==
Dasia vyneri may attain a snout-to-vent length of 6.6 cm (2.6 in).

== Behavior ==
Dasia vyneri is an arboreal species.

== Reproduction ==
Dasia vyneri is oviparous.
