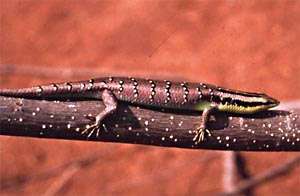
- Dasia johnsinghi

Scientific classification
- Kingdom: Animalia
- Phylum: Chordata
- Class: Reptilia
- Order: Squamata
- Family: Scincidae
- Subfamily: Mabuyinae
- Genus: Dasia; Gray, 1839

= Dasia (lizard) =

Tree skinks

Genus of lizards

Dasia is a genus of lizards, commonly known as tree skinks or dasias, in the family Scincidae. The genus is endemic to Asia.

== Species ==
The genus Dasia contains ten species which are recognized as being valid.

- Dasia griffini Taylor, 1915 – Griffin's dasia
- Dasia grisea (Gray, 1845) – big tree skink, grey dasia, grey tree skink
- Dasia haliana (Nevill in Haly & Nevill, 1887) – Ceylonese dasia
- Dasia johnsinghi Harikrishnan et al., 2012 – barred tree skink
- Dasia nicobarensis Biswas & Sanyal, 1977 – Nicobar dasia, Nicobar tree skink
- Dasia olivacea Gray, 1839 – olive dasia, olive tree skink
- Dasia semicincta (W. Peters, 1867) – Peters's dasia
- Dasia subcaerulea (Boulenger, 1891) – Boulenger's dasia, Boulenger's tree skink
- Dasia vittata (Edeling, 1865) – Borneo skink, striped tree skink
- Dasia vyneri (Shelford, 1905) – Shelford's skink
