= Anslem de Silva =

Sri Lankan naturalist (born 1940)

- ඇන්ස්ලම් ද සිල්වා
- Born: Kongahage Anslem Lawrence de Silva; 1 August 1940 (age 86); Matara, Sri Lanka
- Education: St. Servatius' College; University of Peradeniya
- Children: 1
- Scientific career
- Fields: Herpetology; Biology; Taxonomy

Kongahage Anslem Lawrence de Silva (Sinhala: ඇන්ස්ලම් ද සිල්වා; born 1 August 1940) is a Sri Lankan biologist and herpetologist recognised as a pioneer of modern herpetology in Sri Lanka. His career spanned for more than five decades; de Silva has contributed to the field of zoology with research and publications, particularly on crocodiles, snakes and lizards.

De Silva is known for conservation of crocodiles in Sri Lanka. He is the regional chairman of the Crocodile Specialists Group of the IUCN, South Asia and Iran.

== Personal life ==
He was born on 1 August 1940 in Matara. He completed education from St. Servatius College, Matara. Before entering the field of biology, de Silva was a renowned magician. He won two national awards at All Island Magic Competition and conducted massive shows from Matara to Jaffna. He also published 22 papers on magic. His son Panduka de Silva is also a naturalist where he worked in Andaman Islands on crocodiles.

== Career ==
While at the school, he rescued a rat snake, which led him to move further in field of science. Then he started to rear few non-poisonous snakes, a baby saltwater crocodile, and a few sea turtles in his home, and villagers started calling him Hoony Mahaththaya (Mr Gecko) due to his frequent outings around the village to catch geckos as a food for snakes. At the age of 17, he read the book Snakes of Ceylon written by Frank Wall which induced him to start researching snakes throughout the country.

In 1964, he joined Faculty of Medicine, Peradeniya, as the museum technician of the Department of Public Health. He retired from Department of Community Medicine in 2000.

He is the founder and president of Amphibia and Reptile Research Organisation of Sri Lanka (ARROS), which he started in 1990. ARROS is the first NGO in Sri Lanka aimed at reptile conservation. Due to his enormous contribution, de Silva was appointed as the chairman for Declining Amphibian Populations Task Force in the World Conservation Union (now the IUCN) for Sri Lanka. In 2015, he worked as the co-chairman of the Amphibian Specialist Group of the World Conservation Union. He has published more than 450 research publications on herpetofauna in Sri Lanka for last fifty years. He was the first author to publish a reptile guide with coloured photographs. To create public awareness of reptiles and amphibians, de Silva published the Sri Lanka's first series of posters illustrated with coloured photographs in 1990 and 2001.

De Silva organised a number of events at fourth World Herpetology Congress and World Crocodile Congress. In 1991, University of Peradeniya conferred a Master of Science degree for his contributions to the field of zoology. He also worked as a visiting lecturer at the Faculty of Veterinary Medicine and Animal Science, University of Peradeniya and Rajarata University of Sri Lanka.

== Bibliography ==
- Colour Guide to the Snakes of Sri Lanka (1990)
- The Amphibia of Sri Lanka: A Checklist and an Annotated Bibliography (1996)
- The Herpetofauna of Sri Lanka: A Brief Review (1996)
- The Snakes of Sri Lanka: A Checklist and an Annotated Bibliography (1998)
- The Sauria (Lizards and Varanids) of Sri Lanka: A Checklist and an Annotated Bibliography (1998)
- Biology and Conservation of the Amphibians, Reptiles, and their Habitats in South Asia (1998)
- Conservation Assessment and Management Plan (2000)
- The Herpetofauna of Sri Lanka: An Historical Overview, Current Status with Checklists (2001)
- The Biology and Status of Star Tortoise (Geochelone elegans Schoepff, 1795) (2003)
- The Herpetology of Sri Lanka: Current Research (2004)
- A Photographic Guide to Snakes and Other Reptiles of Sri Lanka (2005)
- The Diversity of the Dumbara Mountains: The Knuckles Massif, Sri Lanka (2005)
- The Diversity of Horton Plains National Park (2007)
- Snakes of Sri Lanka: A Coloured Atlas (2009)
- Amphibians of Sri Lanka: A Photographic Guide to Common Frogs, Toads, and Caecilians (2009)
- A Naturalist's Guide to the Reptiles of Sri Lanka (2017)
- The Crocodiles of Sri Lanka

== Animals named after de Silva ==
- Calotes desilvai – an endemic lizard
- Cnemaspis anslemi – an endemic gecko
- Falcaustra desilvai – a gecko parasite

== See also ==
- Category:Taxa named by Anslem de Silva
- List of herpetologists
