= Dasia subcaerulea =

Conservation status
- Endangered (IUCN 3.1)

Scientific classification
- Kingdom: Animalia
- Phylum: Chordata
- Class: Reptilia
- Order: Squamata
- Family: Scincidae
- Genus: Dasia
- Species: D. subcaerulea

Binomial name
- Dasia subcaerulea (Boulenger, 1891)

Synonyms
- Dasia subcaeruleum (Boulenger, 1891)

Species of lizard

Dasia subcaerulea, Boulenger's dasia or Boulenger's tree skink, is a species of tree skink endemic to the Western Ghats in south India.
