= Palatupana =

- Village
- Location in Sri Lanka
- Coordinates: 6.2393°N 81.3673°E
- Country: Sri Lanka
- Province: Southern Province
- District: Hambantota District
- Time zone: +5.30

Palatupana is a coastal village located in the Hambantota District of Southern Province, Sri Lanka.

== Geography ==
Palatupana lies along B499 road, where that road crosses Yala National Park.
