= Cnemaspis samanalensis =

Scientific classification
- Kingdom: Animalia
- Phylum: Chordata
- Class: Reptilia
- Order: Squamata
- Suborder: Gekkota
- Family: Gekkonidae
- Genus: Cnemaspis
- Species: C. samanalensis

Binomial name
- Cnemaspis samanalensis Wickramasinghe & Munindradasa, 2007

Species of lizard

Cnemaspis samanalensis, also known as the Samanala day gecko, is a species of diurnal gecko endemic to island of Sri Lanka.
