= Islands wolf =

Islands wolf or island wolf may refer to:

- Alexander Archipelago wolf, nicknamed the "islands wolf"
- Falkland Islands wolf, also known as a warrah
- Vancouver Island wolf, a subspecies of gray wolf
- Baffin Island wolf, a wolf exclusively found on Baffin Island and surrounding islands
- Bernard's wolf, nicknamed the "Banks Island wolf"
