= Subspecies of Canis lupus =

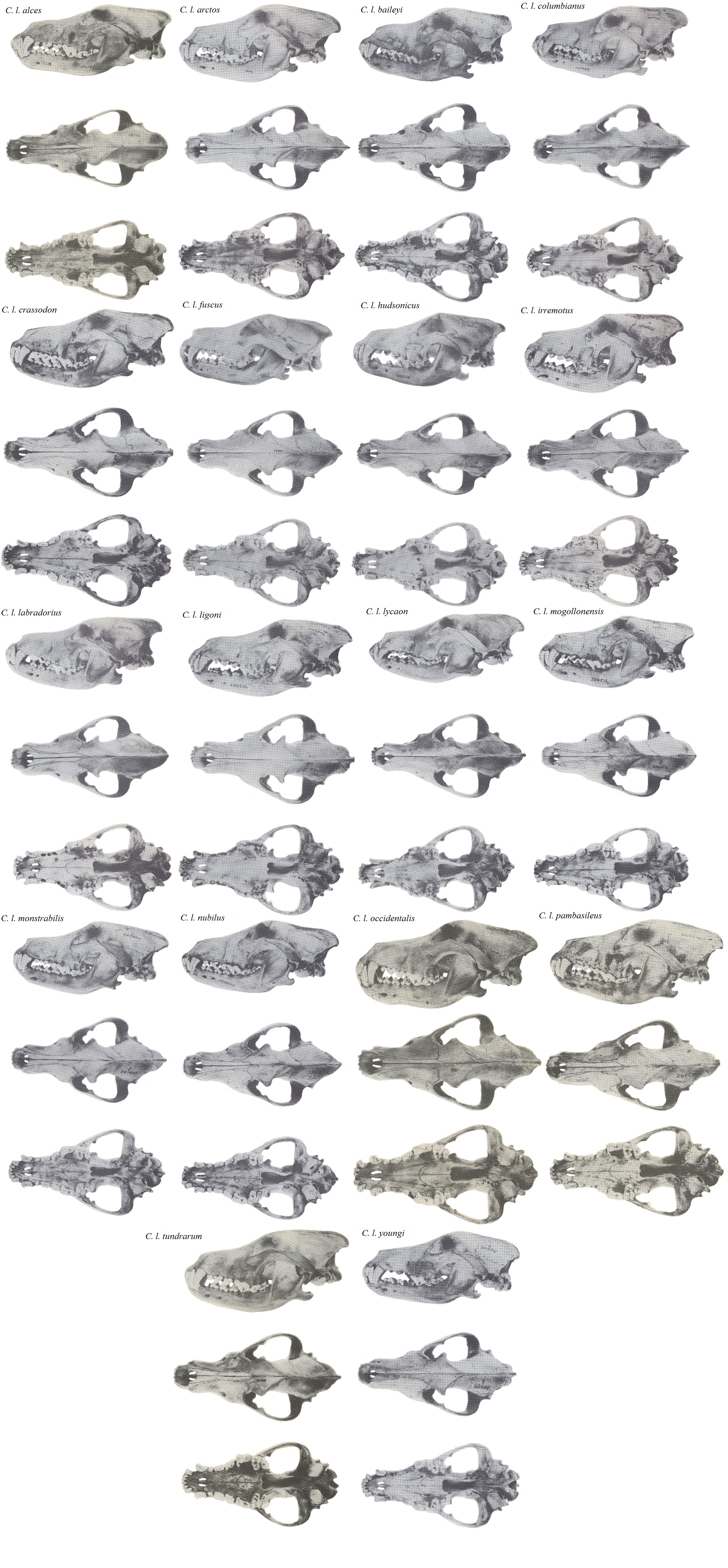
Skulls of various wolf subspecies from North America

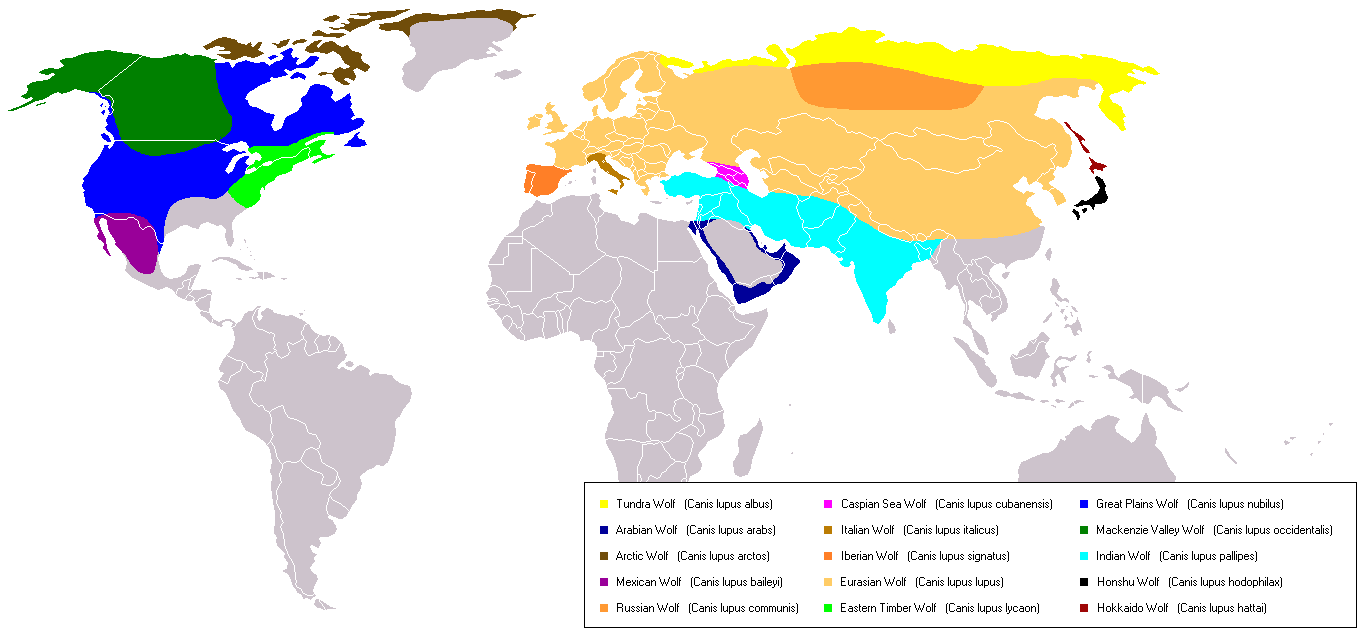
Present and historical range of wild subspecies of C. lupus. This map uses the more broadly defined North American subspecies of Nowak (1995), but see also the map under the section titled North America.

There are 38 subspecies of Canis lupus listed in the taxonomic authority Mammal Species of the World (2005, 3rd edition). These subspecies were named over the past 250 years, and since their naming, a number of them have gone extinct. The nominate subspecies is the Eurasian wolf (Canis lupus lupus).

== Taxonomy ==
In 1758, the Swedish botanist and zoologist Carl Linnaeus published in his Systema Naturae the binomial nomenclature – or the two-word naming – of species. Canis is the Latin word meaning "dog", and under this genus he listed the dog-like carnivores including domestic dogs, wolves, and jackals. He classified the domestic dog as Canis familiaris, and on the next page he classified the wolf as Canis lupus. Linnaeus considered the dog to be a separate species from the wolf because of its head, body, and cauda recurvata – its upturning tail – which is not found in any other canid.

In 1999, a study of mitochondrial DNA indicated that the domestic dog may have originated from multiple wolf populations, with the dingo and New Guinea singing dog "breeds" having developed at a time when human populations were more isolated from each other. In the third edition of Mammal Species of the World published in 2005, the mammalogist W. Christopher Wozencraft listed under the wolf Canis lupus some 36 wild subspecies, and proposed two additional subspecies: familiaris Linnaeus, 1758 and dingo Meyer, 1793. Wozencraft included hallstromi – the New Guinea singing dog – as a taxonomic synonym for the dingo. Wozencraft referred to the mDNA study as one of the guides in forming his decision, and listed the 38 subspecies under the biological common name of "wolf", with the nominate subspecies being the Eurasian wolf (Canis lupus lupus) based on the type specimen that Linnaeus studied in Sweden. However, the classification of several of these canines as either species or subspecies has been challenged by the IUCN/SSC Canid Specialist Group in 2019, a 2020 Trends in Ecology & Evolution literature review, and the American Society of Mammalogists in 2021.

== List of extant subspecies ==
Living subspecies recognized by MSW3 as of 2005 and divided into Old World and New World:

=== Eurasia and Australasia ===
Sokolov and Rossolimo (1985) recognised seven Old World subspecies of wolf. These were C. l. lupus, C. l. albus, C. l. pallipes, C. l. cubanenesis, C. l. campestris, C. l. chanco and C. l. desertorum In his 1995 statistical analysis of skull morphometrics, mammalogist Robert Nowak recognized the first four of those subspecies, synonymized campestris, chanco and desertorum with C. l. lupus, but did not examine the two Japanese subspecies. In addition, he recognized C. l. communis as a subspecies distinct from C. l. lupus. In 2003, Nowak also recognized the distinctiveness of C. l. arabs, C. l. hattai, C. l. italicus, and C. l. hodophilax. In 2005, MSW3 included C. l. filchneri. In 2003, two forms were distinguished in southern China and Inner Mongolia as being separate from C. l. chanco and C. l. filchneri and have yet to be named.

Eurasian and Australasian subspecies of Canis lupus
Subspecies	Image	Authority	Description	Range	Taxonomic synonyms
C. l. albus Tundra wolf		Kerr, 1792	A large, light-furred subspecies.	Northern tundra and forest zones in the European and Asian parts of Russia and Kamchatka. Outside Russia, its range includes the extreme north of Scandinavia.	dybowskii Domaniewski, 1926, kamtschaticus Dybowski, 1922, turuchanensis Ognev, 1923
C. l. arabs Arabian wolf		Pocock, 1934	A small, "desert-adapted" subspecies that is around 66 cm tall and weighs, on average, about 18 kg. Its fur coat varies from short in the summer to long in the winter, possibly because of solar radiation.	Southern Palestine, southern Israel, southern and western Iraq, Oman, Yemen, Jordan, Saudi Arabia and Egypt (Sinai Peninsula).	
C. l. campestris Steppe wolf		Dwigubski, 1804	An average-sized subspecies with short, coarse and sparse fur.	Northern Ukraine, southern Kazakhstan, the Caucasus and the Trans-Caucasus	bactrianus Laptev, 1929, cubanenesis Ognev, 1923, desertorum Bogdanov, 1882
C. l. chanco Himalayan wolf & Mongolian wolf		Gray, 1863	Himalayan Wolf: Long sharp face, elevated brows, broad head, large pointed ears, thick woolly pelage and very full brush of medial length. Above, dull earthy-brown; below, with the entire face and limbs yellowish-white. Mongolian Wolf: The fur is fulvous, on the back longer, rigid, with intermixed black and gray hairs; the throat, chest, belly, and inside of the legs pure white; head pale gray-brown; forehead grizzled with short black and gray hairs.	Himalayan Wolf: The Himalayas and the Tibetan Plateau predominating above 4,000 metres in elevation Mongolian Wolf: Mongolia, northern and central China, Korea, and the Ussuri River region of Russia	niger Sclater, 1874, filchneri Matschie, 1907, karanorensis Matschie, 1907, tschiliensis Matschie, 1907, coreanus Abe, 1923, dorogostaiskii Skalon, 1936
C. l. dingo Dingo and New Guinea singing dog		Meyer, 1793	Generally 52–60 cm tall at the shoulders and measures 117 to 124 cm from nose to tail tip. The average weight is 13 to 20 kg. Fur color is mostly sandy- to reddish-brown, but can include tan patterns and can also be occasionally light brown, black or white.	Australia and New Guinea	antarticus Kerr, 1792 [suppressed ICZN O451:1957], australasiae Desmarest, 1820, australiae Gray, 1826, dingoides Matschie, 1915, macdonnellensis Matschie, 1915, novaehollandiae Voigt, 1831, papuensis Ramsay, 1879, tenggerana Kohlbrugge, 1896, hallstromi Troughton, 1957, harappensis Prashad, 1936 Sometimes included within Canis familiaris when the domestic dog is recognised as a species.
C. l. familiaris Domestic dog but refer Synonyms		Linnaeus, 1758	The domestic dog is a divergent subspecies of the gray wolf and was derived from an extinct population of Late Pleistocene wolves. Through selective pressure and selective breeding, the domestic dog has developed into hundreds of varied breeds and shows more behavioral and morphological variation than any other land mammal.	Worldwide in association with humans	Increasingly proposed as the species Canis familiaris but debated aegyptius Linnaeus, 1758, alco C. E. H. Smith, 1839, americanus Gmelin, 1792, anglicus Gmelin, 1792, antarcticus Gmelin, 1792, aprinus Gmelin, 1792, aquaticus Linnaeus, 1758, aquatilis Gmelin, 1792, avicularis Gmelin, 1792, borealis C. E. H. Smith, 1839, brevipilis Gmelin, 1792, cursorius Gmelin, 1792, domesticus Linnaeus, 1758, extrarius Gmelin, 1792, ferus C. E. H. Smith, 1839, fricator Gmelin, 1792, fricatrix Linnaeus, 1758, fuillus Gmelin, 1792, gallicus Gmelin, 1792, glaucus C. E. H. Smith, 1839, graius Linnaeus, 1758, grajus Gmelin, 1792, hagenbecki Krumbiegel, 1950, haitensis C. E. H. Smith, 1839, hibernicus Gmelin, 1792, hirsutus Gmelin, 1792, hybridus Gmelin, 1792, islandicus Gmelin, 1792, italicus Gmelin, 1792, laniarius Gmelin, 1792, leoninus Gmelin, 1792, leporarius C. E. H. Smith, 1839, major Gmelin, 1792, mastinus Linnaeus, 1758, melitacus Gmelin, 1792, melitaeus Linnaeus, 1758, minor Gmelin, 1792, molossus Gmelin, 1792, mustelinus Linnaeus, 1758, obesus Gmelin, 1792, orientalis Gmelin, 1792, pacificus C. E. H. Smith, 1839, plancus Gmelin, 1792, pomeranus Gmelin, 1792, sagaces C. E. H. Smith, 1839, sagax Linnaeus, 1758, sanguinarius C. E. H. Smith, 1839, scoticus Gmelin, 1792, sibiricus Gmelin, 1792, suillus C. E. H. Smith, 1839, terraenovae C. E. H. Smith, 1839, terrarius C. E. H. Smith, 1839, turcicus Gmelin, 1792, urcani C. E. H. Smith, 1839, variegatus Gmelin, 1792, venaticus Gmelin, 1792, vertegus Gmelin, 1792
C. l. italicus Italian wolf		Altobello, 1921	The pelt is generally of a grey-fulvous colour, which reddens in summer. The belly and cheeks are more lightly coloured, and dark bands are present on the back and tail tip, and occasionally along the fore limbs.	Native to the Italian Peninsula; recently expanded into Switzerland and southeastern France.	lupus Linnaeus, 1758
C. l. lupus Eurasian wolf (nominate subspecies)		Linnaeus, 1758	Generally a large subspecies with rusty ocherous or light gray fur.	Has the largest range among wolf subspecies and is the most common subspecies in Europe and Asia, ranging through Western Europe, Scandinavia, the Caucasus, Russia, China, and Mongolia. Its habitat overlaps with the Indian wolf in some regions of Turkey.	altaicus Noack, 1911, argunensis Dybowski, 1922, canus Sélys Longchamps, 1839, communis Dwigubski, 1804, deitanus Cabrera, 1907, desertorum Bogdanov, 1882, flavus Kerr, 1792, fulvus Sélys Longchamps, 1839, kurjak Bolkay, 1925, lycaon Trouessart, 1910, major Ogérien, 1863, minor Ogerien, 1863, niger Hermann, 1804, orientalis Wagner, 1841, orientalis Dybowski, 1922
C. l. pallipes Indian wolf		Sykes, 1831	A small subspecies with pelage shorter than that of northern wolves and with little to no underfur. Fur color ranges from grayish-red to reddish-white with black tips. The dark V-shaped stripe over the shoulders is much more pronounced than in northern wolves. The underparts and legs are more or less white.	India, Pakistan, Iran, Turkey, Saudi Arabia, northern Israel, and northern Palestine	
C. l. signatus Iberian wolf		Cabrera, 1907	A subspecies with slighter frame than C. l. lupus, white marks on the upper lips, dark marks on the tail, and a pair of dark marks on its front legs.	Northwest of the Iberian Peninsula, which includes northwestern Spain and northern Portugal	lupus Linnaeus, 1758

=== North America ===
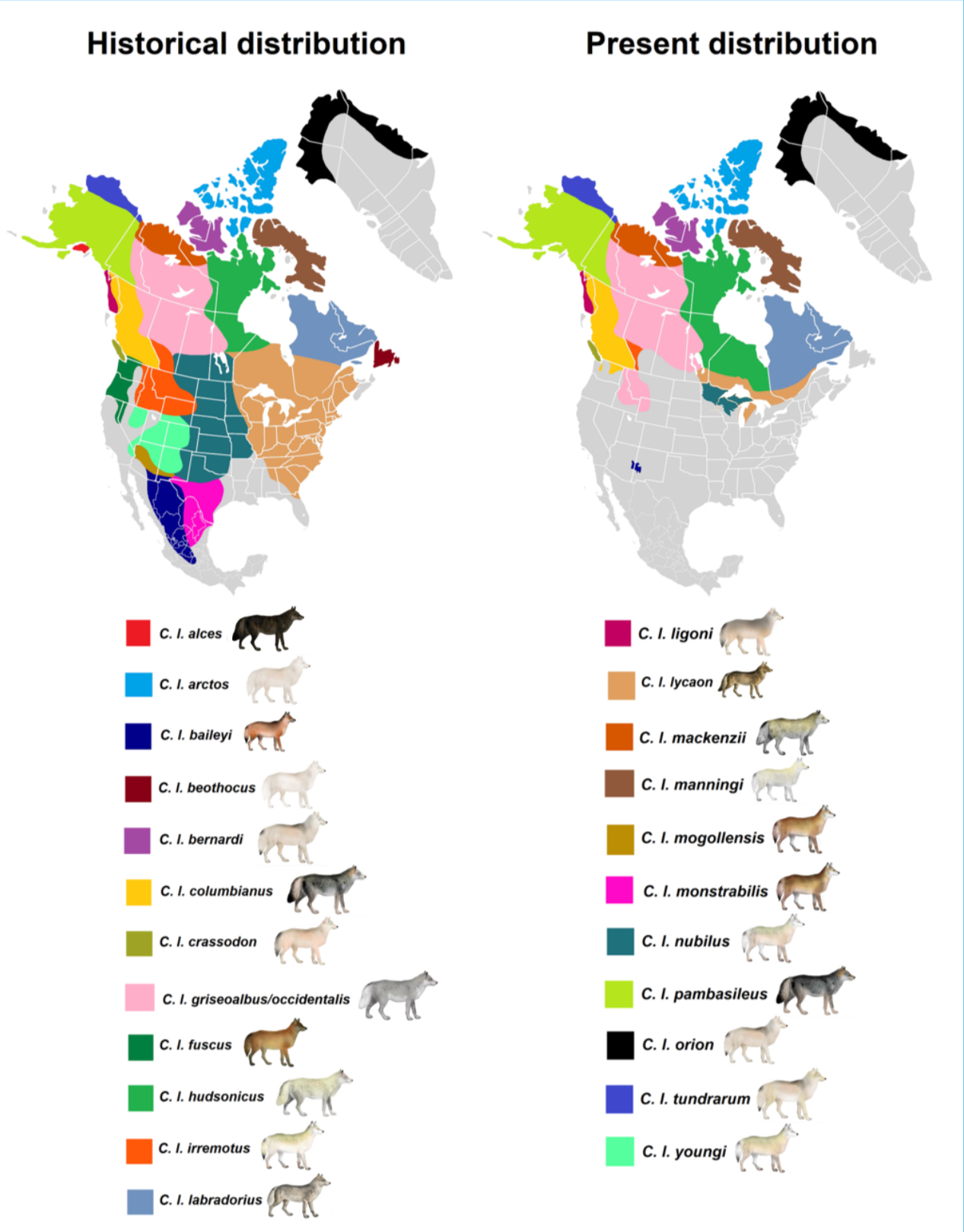
North American wolf subspecies distribution according to Goldman (1944) and Hall (1981). Hall split off C. l. griseoalbus from Goldman's C. l. occidentalis. These subspecies are included in MSW3 2005.

For North America, in 1944 the zoologist Edward Goldman recognized as many as 23 subspecies based on morphology. In 1959, E. Raymond Hall proposed that there had been 24 subspecies of lupus in North America. In 1970, L. David Mech proposed that there was "probably far too many subspecific designations...in use", as most did not exhibit enough points of differentiation to be classified as separate subspecies. The 24 subspecies were accepted by many authorities in 1981 and these were based on morphological or geographical differences, or a unique history. In 1995, the American mammalogist Robert M. Nowak analyzed data on the skull morphology of wolf specimens from around the world. For North America, he proposed that there were only five subspecies of the wolf. These include a large-toothed Arctic wolf named C. l. arctos, a large wolf from Alaska and western Canada named C. l. occidentalis, a small wolf from southeastern Canada named C. l. lycaon, a small wolf from the southwestern U.S. named C. l. baileyi and a moderate-sized wolf that was originally found from Texas to Hudson Bay and from Oregon to Newfoundland named C. l. nubilus.

The taxonomic classification of Canis lupus in Mammal Species of the World (3rd edition, 2005) listed 27 subspecies of North American wolf, corresponding to the 24 Canis lupus subspecies and the three Canis rufus subspecies of Hall (1981). The table below shows the extant subspecies, with the extinct ones listed in the following section.

North American subspecies of Canis lupus
Subspecies	Image	Authority	Description	Range	Taxonomic synonyms
C. l. arctos Arctic wolf		Pocock, 1935	A medium-sized, almost completely white subspecies.	Melville Island (the Northwest Territories and Nunavut), Ellesmere Island	The current (2025) classification of the more broadly defined C. l. arctos of Nowak (1995) synonymizes C. l. orion and C. l. bernardi.
C. l. baileyi Mexican wolf		Nelson and Goldman, 1929	The smallest of the North American subspecies, with dark fur.	Southwestern New Mexico and southeastern Arizona as well as northern Mexico; once ranged into western Texas	
C. l. columbianus British Columbian wolf		Goldman, 1941	Smaller-sized; unique diet of fish and smaller-sized deer in temperate rainforest; similar to crassodon.	Coastal British Columbia and coastal Yukon	Currently (2023) synonymized under C. l. crassodon.
C. l. crassodon Vancouver Island wolf		Hall, 1932	A medium-sized subspecies with grayish fur; similar to columbianus.	Vancouver Island, British Columbia	Currently (2023) C. l. crassodon synonymizes C. l. ligoni and C. l. columbianus.
C. l. familiaris Domestic dog but refer Synonyms		Linnaeus, 1758	The domestic dog is a divergent subspecies of the gray wolf and was derived from an extinct population of Late Pleistocene wolves. Through selective pressure and selective breeding, the domestic dog has developed into hundreds of varied breeds and shows more behavioral and morphological variation than any other land mammal.	Worldwide in association with humans	Increasingly proposed as the species Canis familiaris but debated aegyptius Linnaeus, 1758, alco C. E. H. Smith, 1839, americanus Gmelin, 1792, anglicus Gmelin, 1792, antarcticus Gmelin, 1792, aprinus Gmelin, 1792, aquaticus Linnaeus, 1758, aquatilis Gmelin, 1792, avicularis Gmelin, 1792, borealis C. E. H. Smith, 1839, brevipilis Gmelin, 1792, cursorius Gmelin, 1792, domesticus Linnaeus, 1758, extrarius Gmelin, 1792, ferus C. E. H. Smith, 1839, fricator Gmelin, 1792, fricatrix Linnaeus, 1758, fuillus Gmelin, 1792, gallicus Gmelin, 1792, glaucus C. E. H. Smith, 1839, graius Linnaeus, 1758, grajus Gmelin, 1792, hagenbecki Krumbiegel, 1950, haitensis C. E. H. Smith, 1839, hibernicus Gmelin, 1792, hirsutus Gmelin, 1792, hybridus Gmelin, 1792, islandicus Gmelin, 1792, italicus Gmelin, 1792, laniarius Gmelin, 1792, leoninus Gmelin, 1792, leporarius C. E. H. Smith, 1839, major Gmelin, 1792, mastinus Linnaeus, 1758, melitacus Gmelin, 1792, melitaeus Linnaeus, 1758, minor Gmelin, 1792, molossus Gmelin, 1792, mustelinus Linnaeus, 1758, obesus Gmelin, 1792, orientalis Gmelin, 1792, pacificus C. E. H. Smith, 1839, plancus Gmelin, 1792, pomeranus Gmelin, 1792, sagaces C. E. H. Smith, 1839, sagax Linnaeus, 1758, sanguinarius C. E. H. Smith, 1839, scoticus Gmelin, 1792, sibiricus Gmelin, 1792, suillus C. E. H. Smith, 1839, terraenovae C. E. H. Smith, 1839, terrarius C. E. H. Smith, 1839, turcicus Gmelin, 1792, urcani C. E. H. Smith, 1839, variegatus Gmelin, 1792, venaticus Gmelin, 1792, vertegus Gmelin, 1792
C. l. fuscus Cascade Mountains wolf		Richardson, 1839	A cinnamon-colored subspecies similar to columbianus and irremotus, but darker in color.	Coastal British Columbia. Historically distributed across Washington, western Oregon, and northern California.	gigas Townsend, 1850 Currently (2025) synonymized under C. l. nubilus
C. l. hudsonicus Hudson Bay wolf		Goldman, 1941	A light-colored subspecies similar to occidentalis, but smaller.	Northern Manitoba and the Northwest Territories	Currently (2025) synonymized under C. l. nubilus
C. l. irremotus Northern Rocky Mountain wolf		Goldman, 1937	A medium-sized to large subspecies with pale fur.	The northern Rocky Mountains	Currently (2025) synonymized under C. l. occidentalis
C. l. labradorius Labrador wolf		Goldman, 1937	A medium-sized, light-colored subspecies.	Labrador and northern Quebec; confirmed presence on Newfoundland	Currently (2025) synonymized under C. l. nubilus
C. l. ligoni Alexander Archipelago wolf		Goldman, 1937	A medium-sized, dark-colored subspecies.	The Alexander Archipelago, Alaska	Currently (2023) synonymized under C. l. crassodon.
C. l. lycaon Eastern wolf but refer Synonyms		Schreber, 1775	Two forms are known – a small, reddish-brown colored form called the Algonquin wolf; and a slightly larger, more grayish-brown form called the Great Lakes wolf, which is an admixture of the Algonquin wolf and other gray wolves.	The Algonquin form occupies central Ontario and southwestern Quebec, particularly in and nearby protected areas, such as Algonquin Provincial Park in Ontario, and possibly extreme northeastern U.S. and western New Brunswick. The Great Lakes form occupies northern Ontario, Wisconsin and Minnesota, the Upper Peninsula of Michigan and southern Manitoba. Overlaps of the two forms occur, with intermixing in the southern portions of northern Ontario.	canadensis de Blainville, 1843, ungavensis Comeau, 1940 The Algonquin form is currently (2025) recognized as the species Canis lycaon by the American Society of Mammalogists, but its taxonomy is still debated.
C. l. mackenzii Mackenzie River wolf		Anderson, 1943	A subspecies with variable fur and intermediate in size between occidentalis and manningi.	The southern Northwest Territories	Currently (2025) synonymized under C. l. occidentalis
C. l. manningi Baffin Island wolf		Anderson, 1943	The smallest subspecies of the Arctic, with buffy-white fur.	Baffin Island	Currently (2025) synonymized under C. l. nubilus
C. l. nubilus Great Plains wolf		Say, 1823	A medium-sized, light-colored subspecies.	Throughout the Great Plains from southern Manitoba and Saskatchewan southward to northern Texas	variabilis Wied-Neuwied, 1841. Previously thought extinct in 1926, the Great Plains wolf's descendants were found in the northeastern region of the United States and have become federally protected since 1974. As of 2025 the classification of the more broadly defined C. l. nubilus of Nowak (1995) synonymizes beothucus, fuscus, hudsonicus, irremotus, labradorius, manningi, mogollonensis, monstrabilis and youngi, in which case the subspecies is extant in Canada (see infobox map).
C. l. occidentalis Northwestern wolf		Richardson, 1829	A very large, usually light-colored subspecies, and the biggest subspecies.	Alaska, Yukon, the Northwest Territories, British Columbia, Alberta, Saskatchewan, and the northwestern United States	ater Richardson, 1829, sticte Richardson, 1829 The C. l. occidentalis of Nowak (1995) synonymizes alces, columbianus, griseoalbus, mackenzii, pambasileus and tundrarum, which is the currently (2025) recognized classification.
C. l. orion Greenland wolf		Pocock, 1935		Greenland and the Queen Elizabeth Islands	Currently (2025) synonymized under C. l. arctos
C. l. pambasileus Alaskan Interior wolf		Miller, 1912	The second largest subspecies of wolf, second in skull and tooth proportions only to occidentalis (see chart above), with fur that is black, white or a mixture of both in color.	The Alaskan Interior and Yukon, save for the tundra region of the Arctic Coast	Currently (2025) synonymized under C. l. occidentalis
C. l. rufus Red wolf but refer Synonyms		Audubon and Bachman, 1851	Has a brownish or cinnamon pelt, with gray and black shading on the back and tail. Generally intermediate in size between other North American wolf subspecies and the coyote. Like other wolves, it has almond-shaped eyes, a broad muzzle and a wide nose pad. However, like the coyote, its ears are proportionately larger. It has a deeper profile, a longer and broader head than the coyote, and a less prominent ruff than other wolves.	Historically distributed throughout the Eastern, Southern, and Midwestern United States, from southernmost New York south to Florida and west to Texas. Modern range is eastern North Carolina.	Currently considered a distinct species, Canis rufus, but this proposal is still debated. As a species, the red wolf would have the following subspecies: 1. Canis rufus rufus, formerly Canis niger rufus (Texas red wolf); 2. Canis rufus floridanus, formerly Canis niger niger (Florida black wolf); 3. Canis rufus gregoryi, formerly Canis niger gregoryi (Mississippi Valley red wolf)
C. l. tundrarum Alaskan tundra wolf		Miller, 1912	A large, white-colored subspecies closely resembling pambasileus, though lighter in color.	The Barren Grounds of the Arctic Coast region from near Point Barrow eastward toward Hudson Bay and probably northwards to the Arctic Archipelago	Currently (2025) synonymized under C. l. occidentalis

== List of extinct subspecies ==
Fossil subspecies of Canis lupus
Subspecies	Image	Authority	Description	Range	Taxonomic synonyms
† C. l. maximus		Boudadi-Maligne, 2012	The largest subspecies of all known extinct and extant wolves from Western Europe. The wolf's long bones are 10% longer than those of extant European wolves, 12% larger than those of C. l. santenaisiensis and 20% longer than those of C. l. lunellensis. The teeth are robust, the posterior denticules on the lower premolars p2, p3, p4 and upper P2 and P3 are highly developed, and the diameter of the lower carnassial (m1) were larger than any known European wolf.	Jaurens Cave, southern France	
† C. l. spelaeus Cave wolf		Goldfuss, 1823	Its bone proportions are close to those of the Canadian Arctic-boreal mountain-adapted timber wolf and a little larger than those of the modern European wolf.	Across Europe	brevis Kuzmina, 1994
† Unnamed Late Pleistocene Italian subspecies		Berte, Pandolfi, 2014	Known from fragmentary remains, it was a large subspecies comparable in size and shape to C. l. maximus.	Avetrana (Italy)	

Subspecies recognized by MSW3 as of 2005 which have gone extinct over the past 150 years:

Extinct subspecies of Canis lupus
Subspecies	Image	Authority	Description	Range	Taxonomic synonyms
† C. l. alces Kenai Peninsula wolf		Goldman, 1941	One of the largest North American subspecies, similar to pambasileus. Its fur color is silver-gray or brindle-black.	The Kenai Peninsula, Alaska	Currently (2025) synonymized under C. l. occidentalis
† C. l. beothucus Newfoundland wolf		G. M. Allen and Barbour, 1937	A medium-sized, white-furred subspecies. Its former range is slowly being claimed by its relative, the Labrador wolf (C. l. labradorius).	Newfoundland	Currently (2025) synonymized under C. l. nubilus
† C. l. bernardi Banks Island wolf		Anderson, 1943	A large, slender subspecies with a narrow muzzle and large carnassials.	Limited to Banks and Victoria Islands in the Canadian Arctic	banksianus Anderson, 1943 Currently (2025) synonymized under C. l. arctos
† C. l. floridanus Florida black wolf but refer Synonyms		Miller, 1912	A jet-black subspecies that is described as having been extremely similar to the red wolf in both size and weight. This subspecies became extinct in 1908.	Florida	Currently (2025) recognized as a subspecies of Canis rufus as Canis rufus floridanus, but debated
† C. l. griseoalbus Manitoba wolf		Baird, 1858		Northern Alberta, Saskatchewan, and Manitoba	knightii Anderson, 1945 Currently (2025) synonymized under C. l. occidentalis
† C. l. hattai Hokkaido wolf		Kishida, 1931	Similar in size, and related to, the wolves of North America.	Hokkaido, Sakhalin, the Kamchatkan Peninsula, and Iturup and Kunashir Islands just to the east of Hokkaido in the Kuril Archipelago	rex Pocock, 1935
† C. l. hodophilax Japanese wolf		Temminck, 1839	Smaller in size compared to other subspecies, except for the Arabian wolf (C. l. arabs).	Japanese islands of Honshū, Shikoku, and Kyūshū (but not Hokkaido)	japonicus Nehring, 1885
† C. l. mogollonensis Mogollon Mountains wolf		Goldman, 1937	A small, dark-colored subspecies, intermediate in size between youngi and baileyi.	Arizona and New Mexico	Currently (2025) synonymized under C. l. nubilus
† C. l. monstrabilis Texas wolf		Goldman, 1937	Similar in size and color to mogollonensis and possibly the same subspecies.	Texas, New Mexico, and northern Mexico	niger Bartram, 1791 Currently (2025) synonymized under C. l. nubilus
† C. l. youngi Southern Rocky Mountain wolf		Goldman, 1937	A medium-sized, light-colored subspecies closely resembling nubilus, though larger, with more blackish-buff hairs on the back.	Southeastern Idaho, southwestern Wyoming, northeastern Nevada, Utah, western and central Colorado, northwestern Arizona and northwestern New Mexico	Currently (2025) synonymized under C. l. nubilus

Subspecies discovered since the publishing of MSW3 in 2005 which have gone extinct over the past 150 years:

Extinct subspecies of Canis lupus
Subspecies	Image	Authority	Description	Range	Taxonomic synonyms
† C. l. cristaldii Sicilian wolf		Angelici and Rossi, 2018	A slender, short-legged subspecies with light, tawny-colored fur. The dark bands present on the forelimbs of the mainland Italian wolf were absent or poorly defined in the Sicilian wolf.	Sicily	

== Disputed subspecies ==
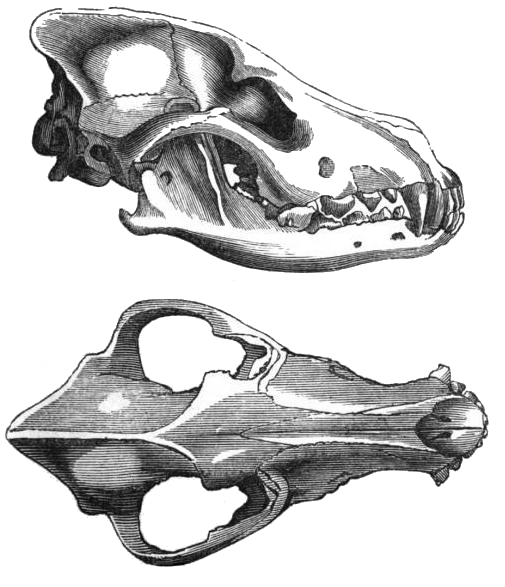
Skull of a European wolf

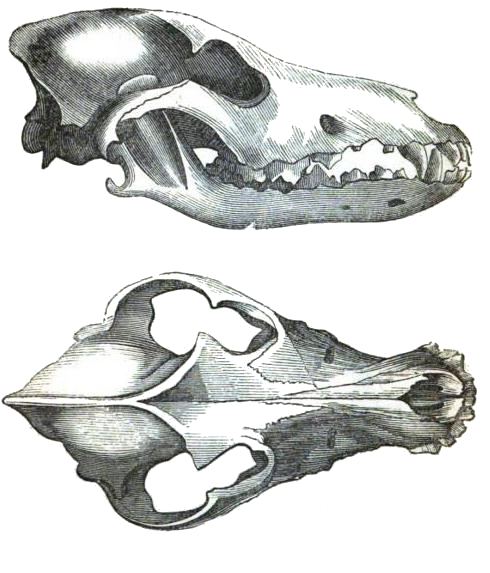
Skull of a Canadian wolf

=== Global ===
In 2019, a workshop hosted by the IUCN/SSC Canid Specialist Group considered the New Guinea singing dog and the dingo to be feral dogs (Canis familiaris). In 2020, a literature review of canid domestication stated that modern dogs were not descended from the same Canis lineage as modern wolves, and proposed that dogs may be descended from a Pleistocene wolf closer in size to a village dog. In 2021, the American Society of Mammalogists also considered dingos a feral dog (Canis familiaris) population.

=== Eurasia ===
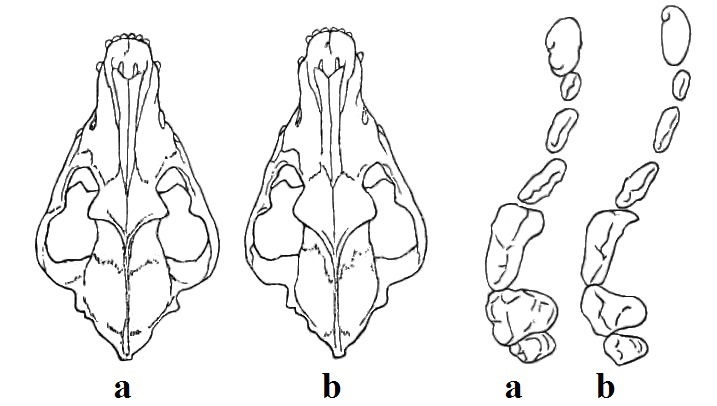
Giuseppe Altobello's 1925 comparative illustration of the skulls and dentition of C. l. lupus (a) and C. l. italicus (b). The distinct status of the latter is currently unrecognized by MSW3.

==== Italian wolf ====
The Italian wolf (or Apennine wolf) was first recognised as a distinct subspecies (Canis lupus italicus) in 1921 by zoologist Giuseppe Altobello. Altobello's classification was later rejected by several authors, including Reginald Innes Pocock, who synonymised C. l. italicus with C. l. lupus. In 2002, the noted paleontologist R.M. Nowak reaffirmed the morphological distinctiveness of the Italian wolf and recommended the recognition of Canis lupus italicus. A number of DNA studies have found the Italian wolf to be genetically distinct. In 2004, the genetic distinction of the Italian wolf subspecies was supported by analysis which consistently assigned all the wolf genotypes of a sample in Italy to a single group. This population also showed a unique mitochondrial DNA control-region haplotype, the absence of private alleles and lower heterozygosity at microsatellite loci, as compared to other wolf populations. In 2010, a genetic analysis indicated that a single wolf haplotype (w22) unique to the Apennine Peninsula and one of the two haplotypes (w24, w25), unique to the Iberian Peninsula, belonged to the same haplogroup as the prehistoric wolves of Europe. Another haplotype (w10) was found to be common to the Iberian peninsula and the Balkans. These three populations with geographic isolation exhibited a near lack of gene flow and spatially correspond to three glacial refugia.

The taxonomic reference Mammal Species of the World (3rd edition, 2005) does not recognize Canis lupus italicus; however, NCBI/Genbank publishes research papers under that name.

==== Iberian wolf ====
The Iberian wolf was first recognised as a distinct subspecies (Canis lupus signatus) in 1907 by zoologist Ángel Cabrera. The wolves of the Iberian peninsula have morphologically distinct features from other Eurasian wolves and each are considered by their researchers to represent their own subspecies.

The taxonomic reference Mammal Species of the World (3rd edition, 2005) does not recognize Canis lupus signatus; however, NCBI/Genbank does list it.

==== Himalayan wolf ====
Phylogenetic tree with timing in years for Canis lupus (Note: For a full set of supporting references, refer to note (a) in the phylotree at Evolution of the wolf)

- 250,000
  - 120,000
    - 80,000
      - 31,000
        - Domestic dog
        - Holarctic gray wolf
      - Late Pleistocene wolf†
    - Indian plains wolf
  - Himalayan wolf

The Himalayan wolf is distinguished by its mitochondrial DNA, which is basal to all other wolves. The taxonomic name of this wolf is disputed, with the species Canis himalayensis being proposed based on two limited DNA studies. In 2017, a study of mitochondrial DNA, X-chromosome (maternal lineage) markers and Y-chromosome (male lineage) markers found that the Himalayan wolf was genetically basal to the Holarctic grey wolf and has an association with the African golden wolf.

In 2019, a workshop hosted by the IUCN/SSC Canid Specialist Group noted that the Himalayan wolf's distribution included the Himalayan range and the Tibetan Plateau. The group recommends that this wolf lineage be known as the "Himalayan wolf" and classified as Canis lupus chanco until a genetic analysis of the holotypes is available. In 2020, further research on the Himalayan wolf found that it warranted species-level recognition under the Unified Species Concept, the Differential Fitness Species Concept, and the Biological Species Concept. It was identified as an Evolutionary Significant Unit that warranted assignment onto the IUCN Red List for its protection.

==== Indian plains wolf ====
The Indian plains wolf is a proposed clade within the Indian wolf (Canis lupus pallipes) that is distinguished by its mitochondrial DNA, which is basal to all other wolves except for the Himalayan wolf. The taxonomic status of this wolf clade is disputed, with the separate species Canis indica being proposed based on two limited DNA studies. The proposal has not been endorsed because it relied on a limited number of museum and zoo samples that may not have been representative of the wild population, and a call for further fieldwork has been made.

The taxonomic reference Mammal Species of the World (3rd edition, 2005) does not recognize Canis indica; however, NCBI/Genbank lists it as a new subspecies, Canis lupus indica.

==== Southern Chinese wolf ====
In 2017, a comprehensive study found that the gray wolf was present across all of mainland China, both in the past and today. It exists in southern China, which refutes claims made by some researchers in the Western world that the wolf had never existed in southern China. This wolf has not been taxonomically classified.

In 2019, a genomic study on the wolves of China included museum specimens of wolves from southern China that were collected between 1963 and 1988. The wolves in the study formed three clades: northern Asian wolves that included those from northern China and eastern Russia, Himalayan wolves from the Tibetan Plateau, and a unique population from southern China. One specimen from Zhejiang Province in eastern China shared gene flow with the wolves from southern China; however, its genome was 12–14 percent admixed with a canid that may be the dhole or an unknown canid that predates the genetic divergence of the dhole. The wolf population from southern China is believed to still exist in that region.

=== North America ===
==== Coastal wolves ====
A study of the three coastal wolves indicates a close phylogenetic relationship across regions that are geographically and ecologically contiguous, and the study proposed that Canis lupus ligoni (the Alexander Archipelago wolf), Canis lupus columbianus (the British Columbian wolf), and Canis lupus crassodon (the Vancouver Coastal Sea wolf) should be recognized as a single subspecies of Canis lupus, synonymized as Canis lupus crassodon. They share the same habitat and prey species, and form one study's six identified North American ecotypes – a genetically and ecologically distinct population separated from other populations by their different types of habitat.

==== Eastern wolf ====
The eastern wolf has two proposals over its origin. One is that the eastern wolf is a distinct species (C. lycaon) that evolved in North America, as opposed to the gray wolf that evolved in the Old World, and is related to the red wolf. The other is that it is derived from admixture between gray wolves, which inhabited the Great Lakes area and coyotes, forming a hybrid that was classified as a distinct species by mistake.

The taxonomic reference Mammal Species of the World (3rd edition, 2005) does not recognize Canis lycaon; however, NCBI/Genbank does list it. In 2021, the American Society of Mammalogists also considered Canis lycaon a valid species.

==== Red wolf ====
The red wolf is an enigmatic taxon, of which there are two proposals over its origin. One is that the red wolf is a distinct species (C. rufus) that has undergone human-influenced admixture with coyotes. The other is that it was never a distinct species but was derived from past admixture between coyotes and gray wolves, due to the gray wolf population being eliminated by humans.

The taxonomic reference Mammal Species of the World (3rd edition, 2005) does not recognize Canis rufus; however, NCBI/Genbank does list it. In 2021, the American Society of Mammalogists also considered Canis rufus a valid species.

== See also ==
- List of gray wolf populations by country
- Wolf distribution
- Cave wolf
- Pleistocene wolf
