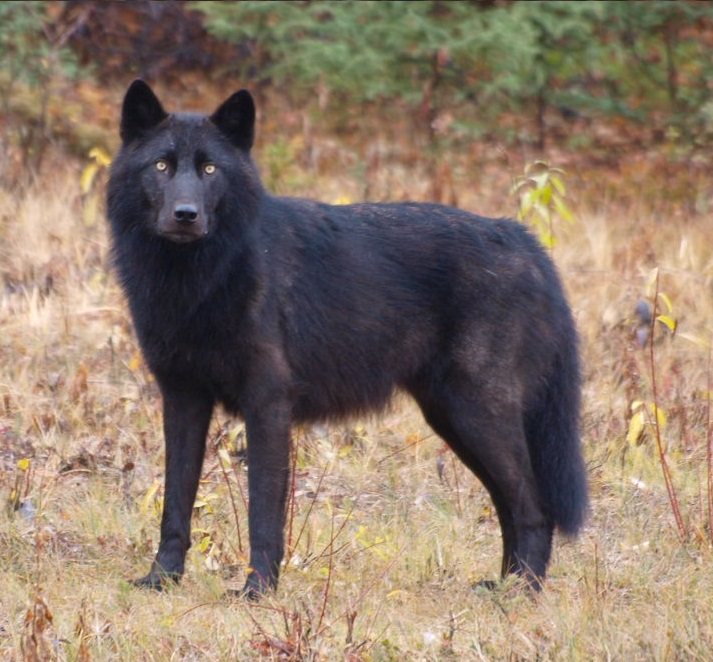
- Melanistic C. l. columbianus, Lower Post, British Columbia

Conservation status
- Apparently Secure (NatureServe)

Scientific classification
- Kingdom: Animalia
- Phylum: Chordata
- Class: Mammalia
- Order: Carnivora
- Family: Canidae
- Genus: Canis
- Species: C. lupus
- Subspecies: C. l. columbianus

Trinomial name
- Canis lupus columbianus Goldman, 1941
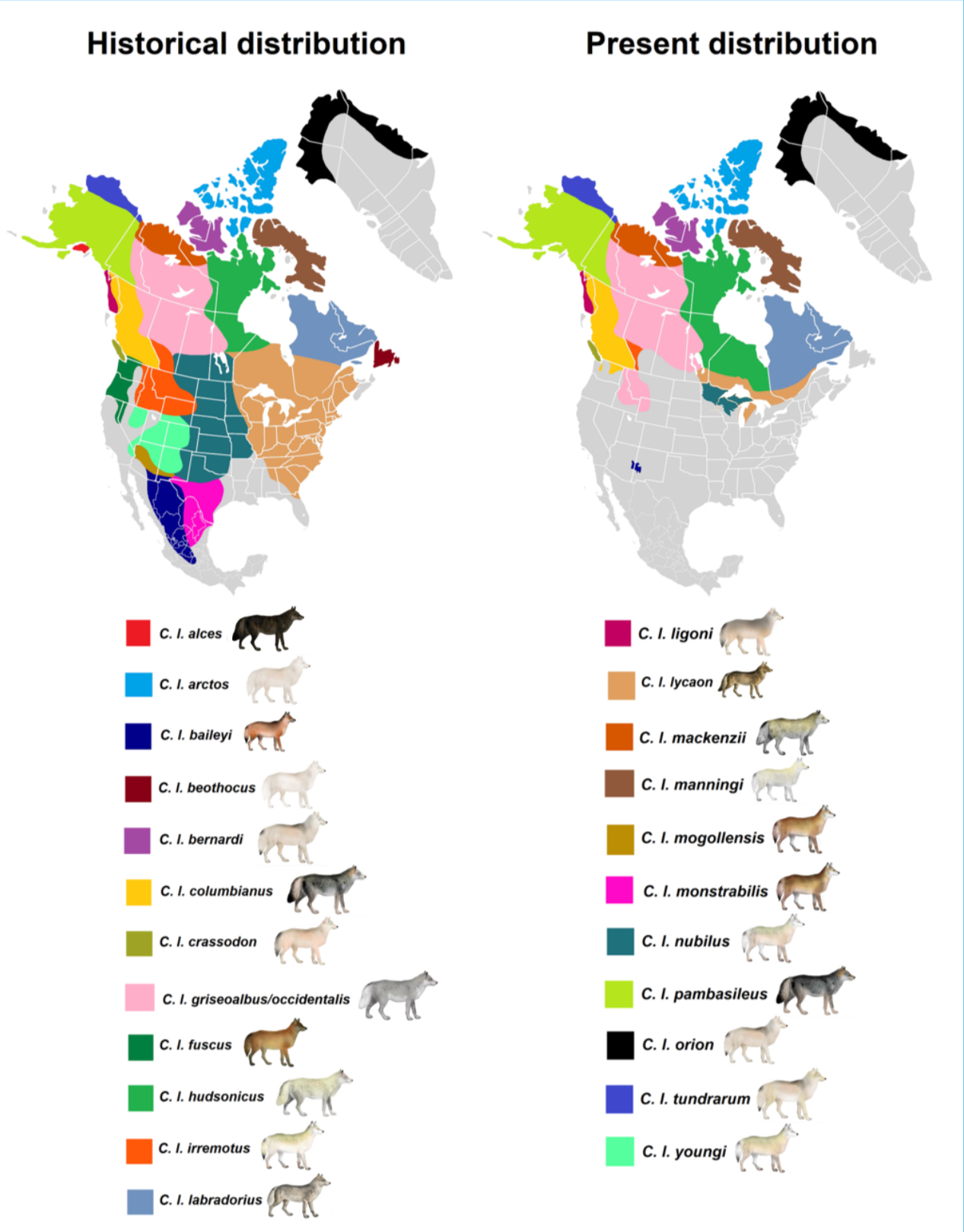
- Historical and present range of gray wolf subspecies in North America

Synonyms
- Canis crassodon columbianus

= British Columbia wolf =

Subspecies of the gray wolf

The British Columbia wolf (Canis lupus columbianus) is a subspecies of gray wolf which lives in a narrow region that includes those parts of the mainland coast and near-shore islands that are covered with temperate rainforest, which extends from Vancouver Island, British Columbia, to the Alexander Archipelago in south-east Alaska. This area is bounded by the Coast Mountains.

== Taxonomy ==
The wolf was first classed as a distinct subspecies in 1941 by Edward Goldman, who described his specimen as being large with a skull closely resembling that of C. l. pambasileus, and whose fur is generally of a cinnamon-buff colour. This wolf is recognized as a subspecies of Canis lupus in the taxonomic authority Mammal Species of the World (2005).

Studies using mitochondrial DNA have indicated that the wolves of coastal south-east Alaska are genetically distinct from inland gray wolves, reflecting a pattern also observed in other taxa. They show a phylogenetic relationship with extirpated wolves from the south (Oklahoma), indicating that these wolves are the last remains of a once widespread group that has been largely extirpated during the last century, and that the wolves of northern North America had originally expanded from southern refuges below the Wisconsin glaciation after the ice had melted at the end of the Last Glacial Maximum. These findings call into question the taxonomic classification of C. l. nulibus proposed by Nowak. Another study found that the wolves of coastal British Columbia were genetically and ecologically distinct from the inland wolves, including other wolves from inland British Columbia. A study of the three coastal wolves indicated a close phylogenetic relationship across regions that are geographically and ecologically contiguous, and the study proposed that Canis lupus ligoni (Alexander Archipelago wolf), Canis lupus columbianus (British Columbia wolf), and Canis lupus crassodon (Vancouver Island wolf) should be recognized as a single subspecies of Canis lupus.

In 2016, two studies compared the DNA sequences of 42,000 single nucleotide polymorphisms in North American gray wolves and found the coastal wolves to be genetically and phenotypically distinct from other wolves. They share the same habitat and prey species, and form one of the study's six identified ecotypes – a genetically and ecologically distinct population separated from other populations by their different type of habitat. The local adaptation of a wolf ecotype most likely reflects the wolf's preference to remain in the type of habitat that it was born into. Wolves that prey on fish and small deer in wet, coastal environments tend to be smaller than other wolves.

== Description ==
The British Columbia wolf is one of the largest subspecies of North American wolves. They weigh around 80 (36 kg) to 150 pounds (68 kg) and are roughly 5ft (152 cm) to 5ft 10 (178 cm) long. These wolves have long coats which were usually black, often mixed with grey, or brown.
