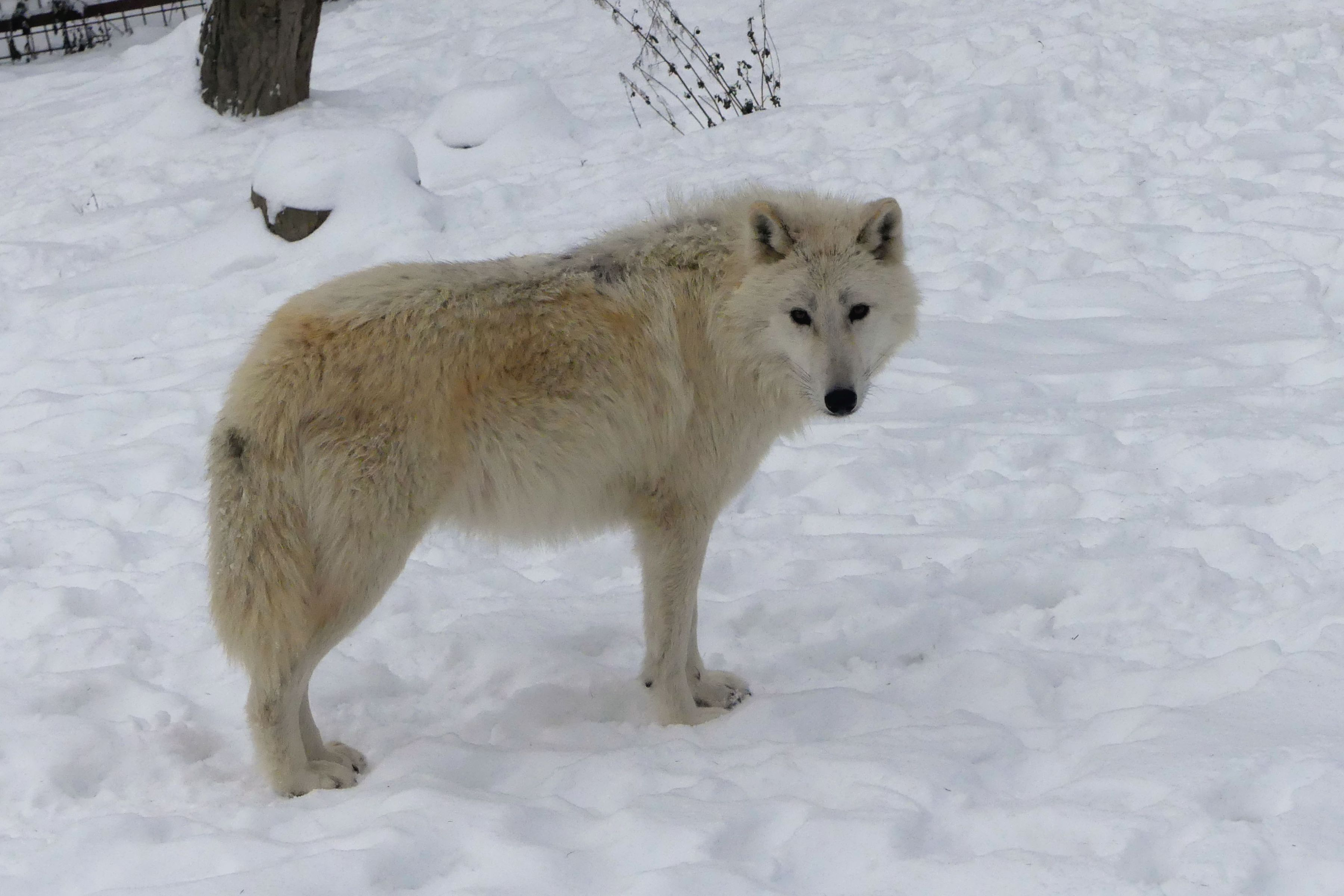
- Hudson Bay wolf in Olomouc Zoo, Czech Republic

Conservation status
- Secure (NatureServe)

Scientific classification
- Kingdom: Animalia
- Phylum: Chordata
- Class: Mammalia
- Order: Carnivora
- Family: Canidae
- Genus: Canis
- Species: C. lupus
- Subspecies: C. l. hudsonicus

Trinomial name
- Canis lupus hudsonicus Goldman, 1941
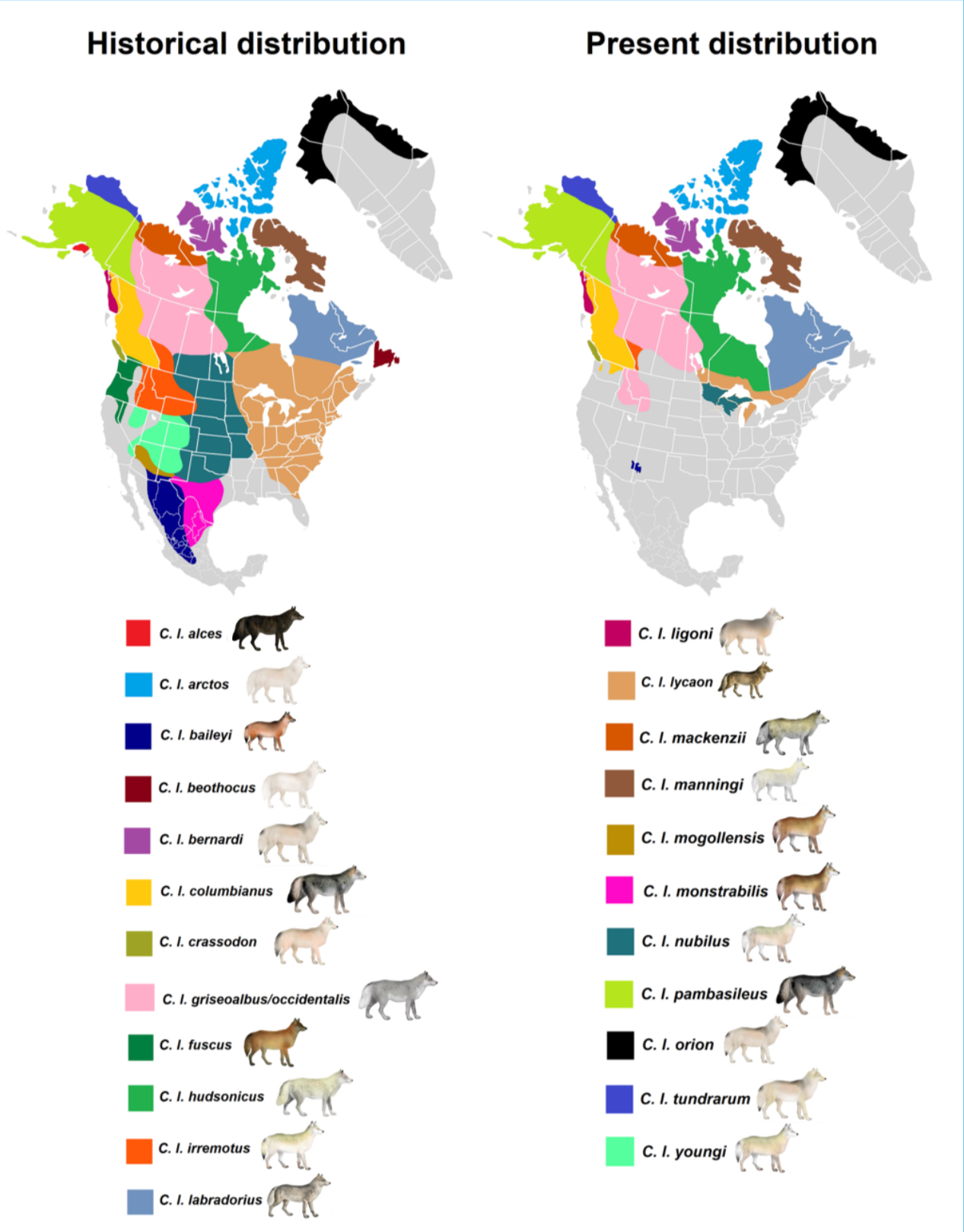
- Historical and present range of gray wolf subspecies in North America

Synonyms
- Canis albus hudsonicus

= Hudson Bay wolf =

Subspecies of carnivore

The Hudson Bay wolf (Canis lupus hudsonicus) is a subspecies of gray wolf native to the northern Kivalliq Region, including the northwestern coast of Hudson Bay in Canada. It was first classed as a distinct subspecies in 1941 by Edward Goldman, who described it as being a white colored, medium-sized subspecies similar to C. l. arctos, but with a flatter skull. This wolf is recognized as a subspecies of Canis lupus in the taxonomic authority Mammal Species of the World (2005).

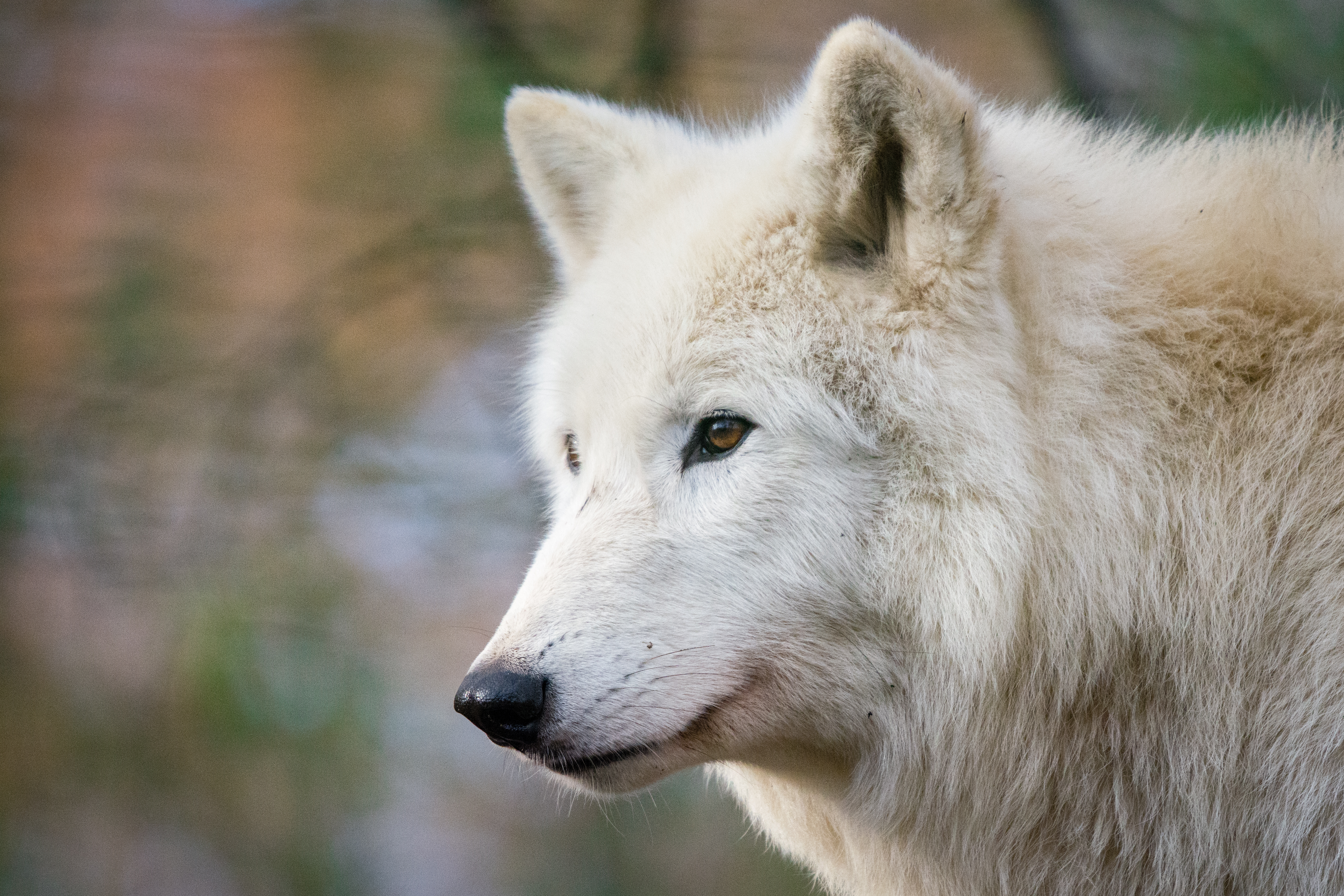
