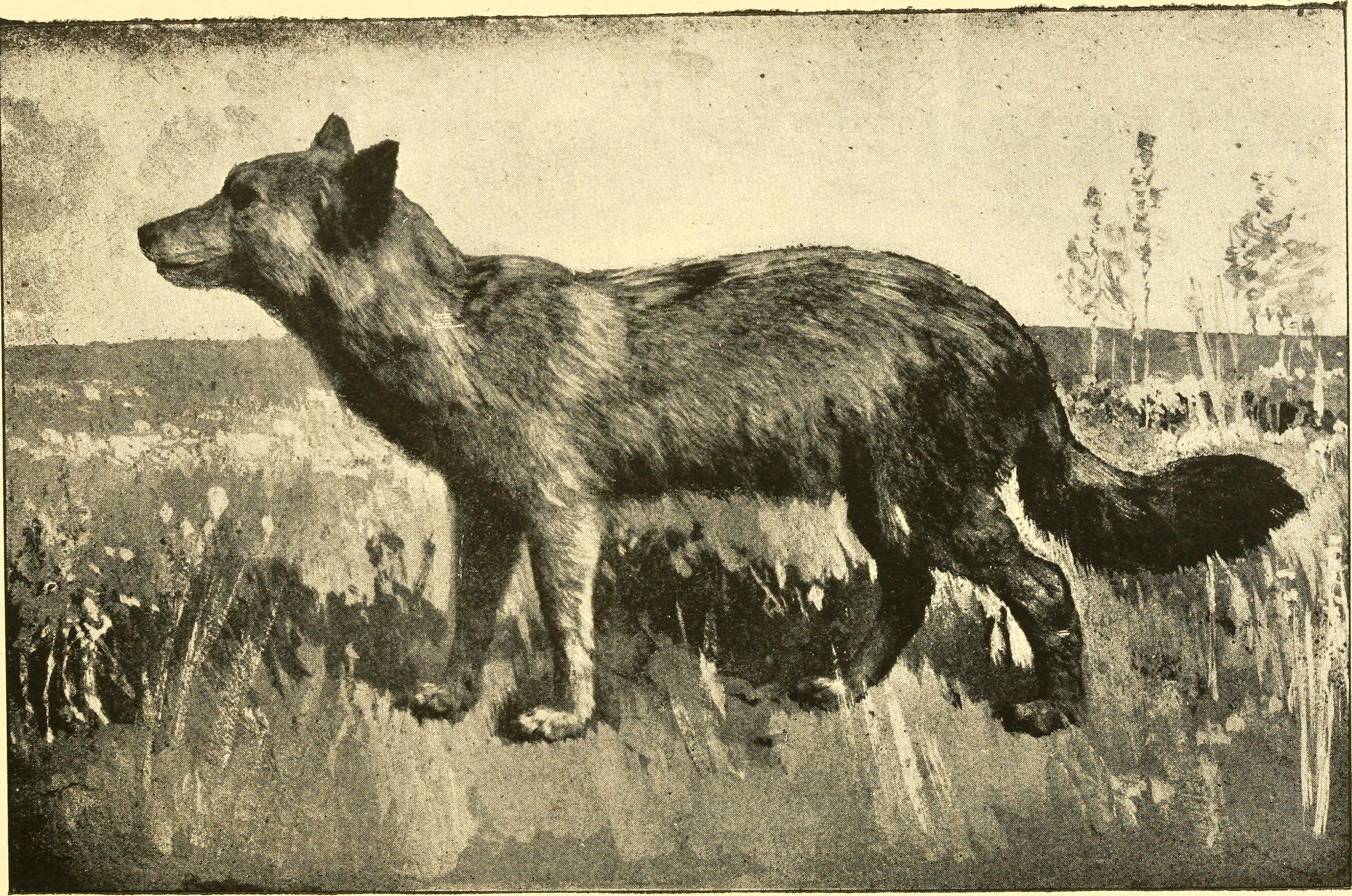

Conservation status
- Extinct

Scientific classification
- Kingdom: Animalia
- Phylum: Chordata
- Class: Mammalia
- Order: Carnivora
- Family: Canidae
- Genus: Canis
- Species: C. lupus
- Subspecies: †C. l. griseoalbus

Trinomial name
- †Canis lupus griseoalbus Baird, 1858
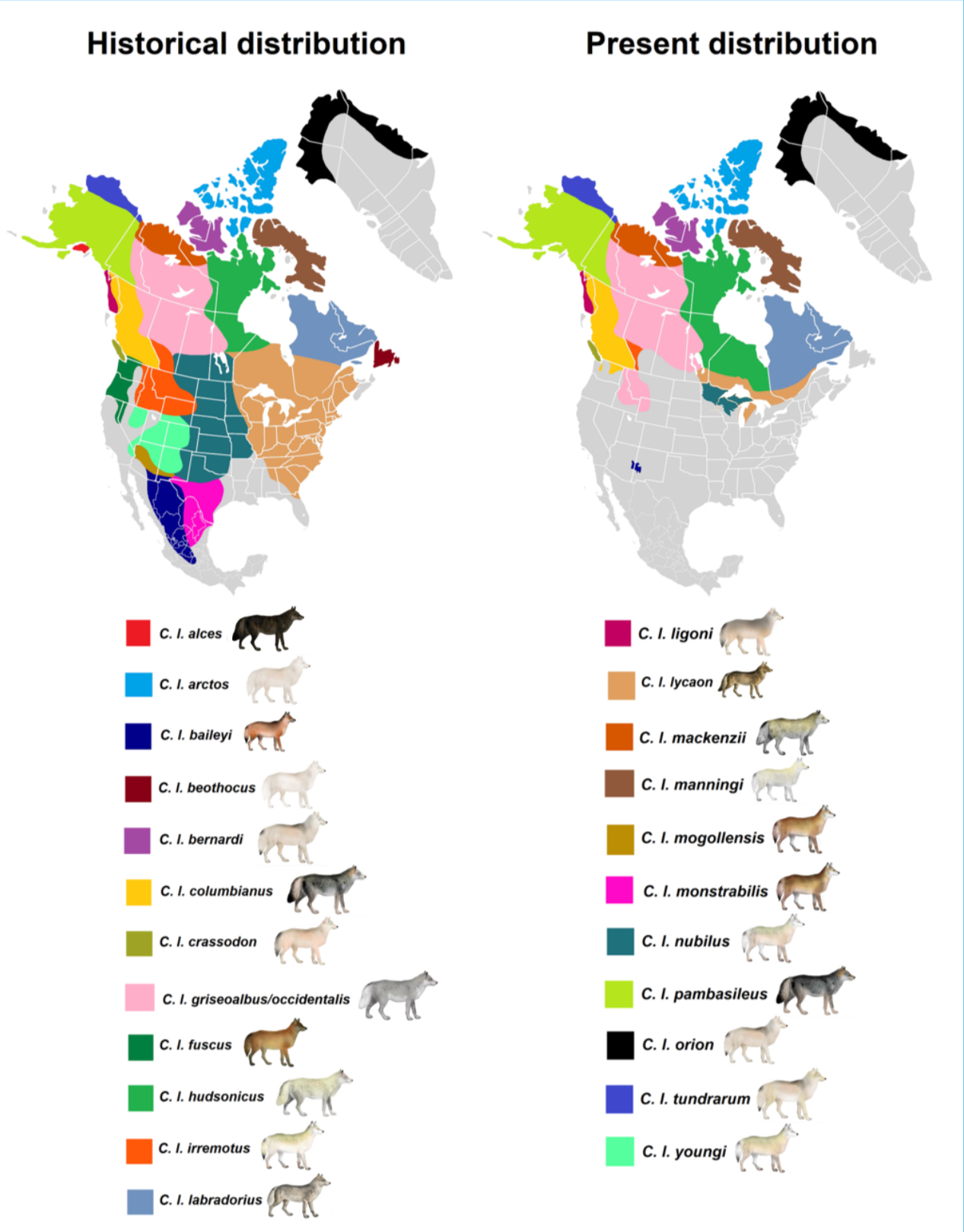
- Historical and present range of gray wolf subspecies in North America

Synonyms
- knightii (Anderson, 1945)

= Manitoba wolf =

Extinct subspecies of carnivore

The Manitoba wolf (Canis lupus griseoalbus), also known as the grey-white wolf, is an extinct subspecies of gray wolf that roamed in the southern Northwest Territories, northern Alberta, Saskatchewan, and south-central Manitoba. This wolf is recognized as a subspecies of Canis lupus in the taxonomic authority Mammal Species of the World (2005).

== History ==
In the early 19th century, John Richardson first cataloged the Manitoba wolf and gave it its taxonomic name. The species itself was highly prized for its fur and was hunted to extinction in the wild in the early 20th century.
