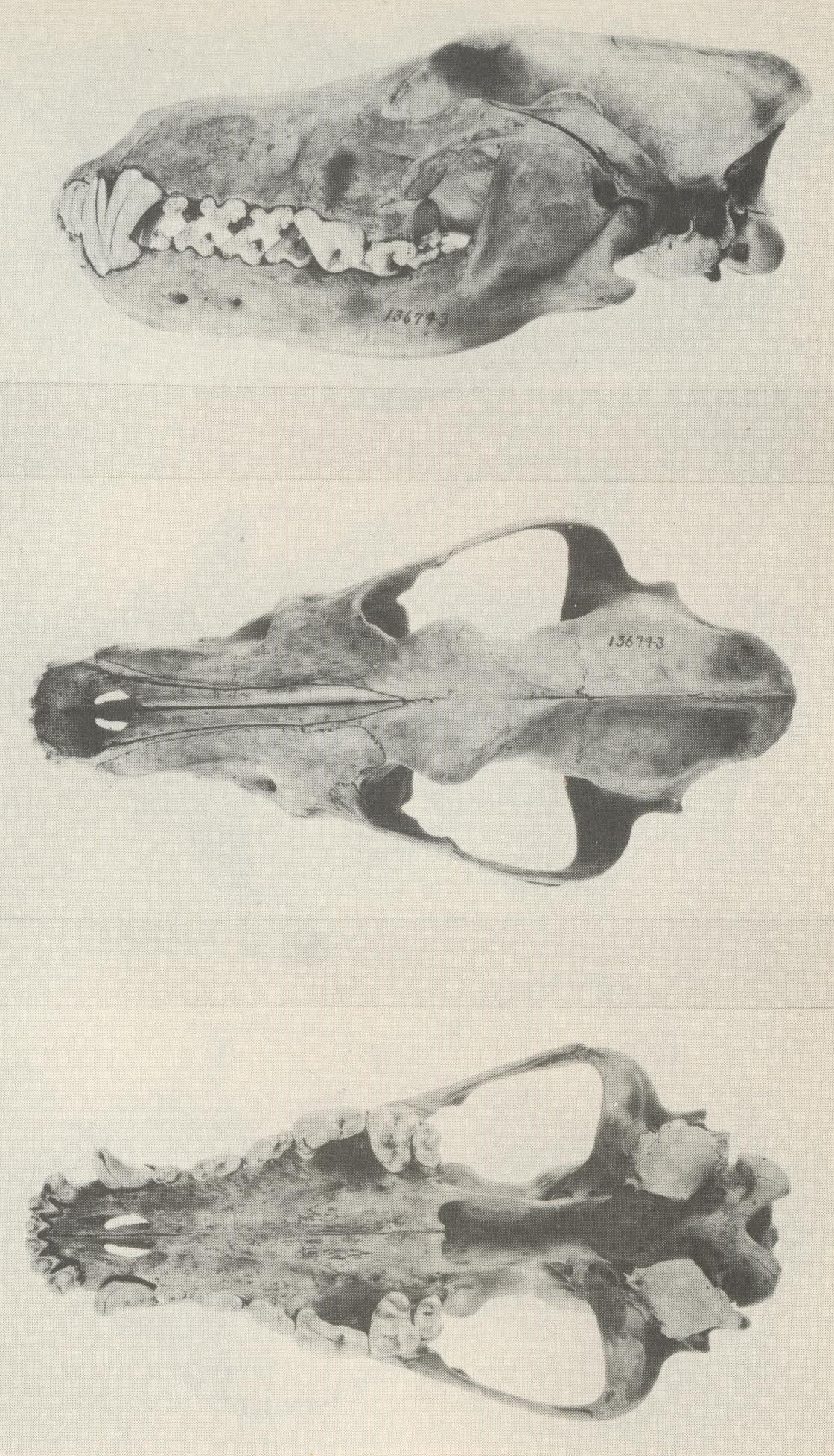

Conservation status
- Extinct (1925 or 1955) (IUCN 3.1)

Scientific classification
- Kingdom: Animalia
- Phylum: Chordata
- Class: Mammalia
- Order: Carnivora
- Family: Canidae
- Genus: Canis
- Species: C. lupus
- Subspecies: †C. l. alces

Trinomial name
- †Canis lupus alces Goldman, 1941
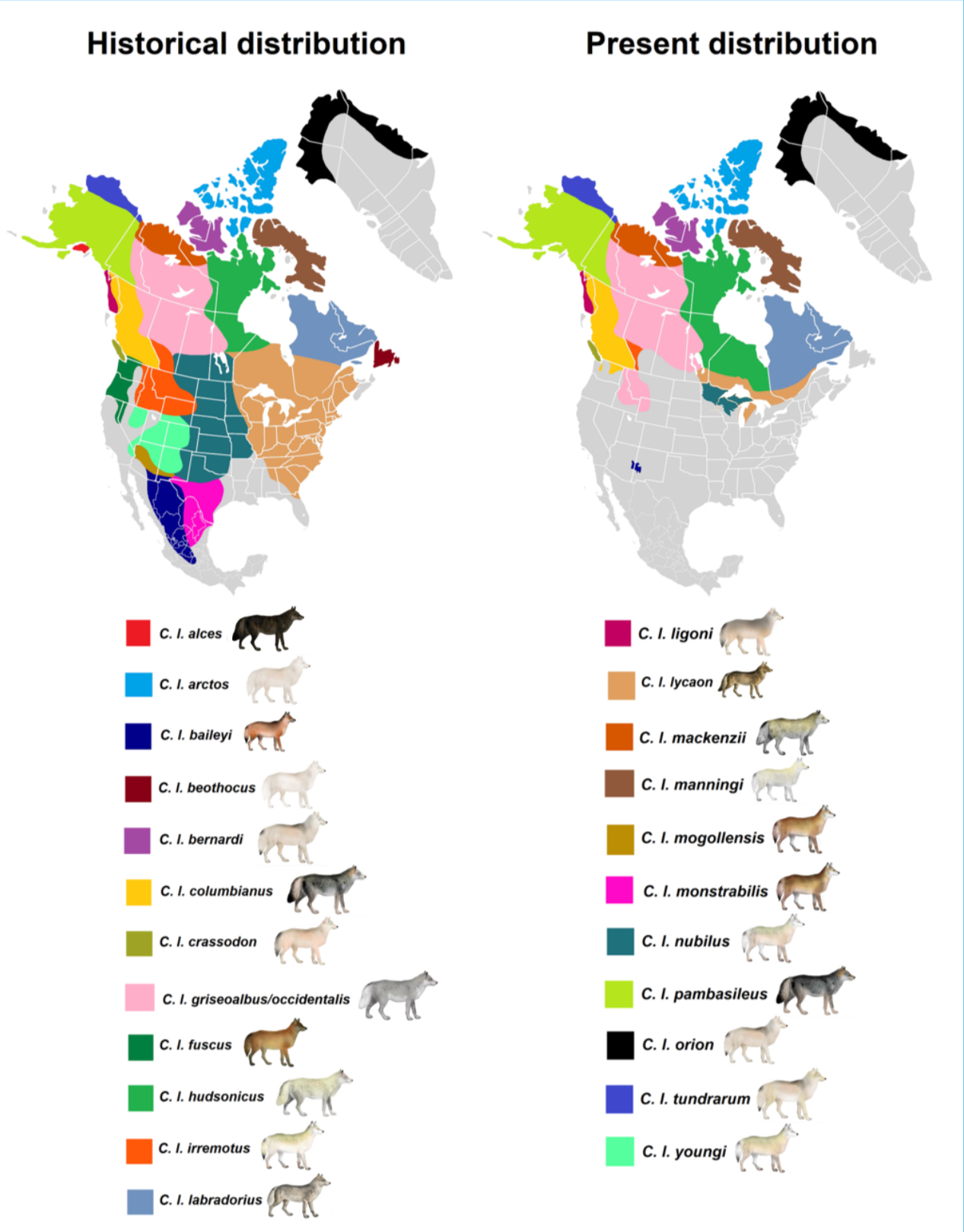
- Historical and present range of gray wolf subspecies in North America

= Kenai Peninsula wolf =

Extinct subspecies of the gray wolf in southern Alaska

The Kenai Peninsula wolf (Canis lupus alces), also known as the Kenai Peninsula grey wolf, is an extinct subspecies of the gray wolf that lived on the Kenai Peninsula in southern Alaska.

== Taxonomy ==
The subspecies was classified in 1941 by Edward Alphonso Goldman based on five skulls from two adult females and three immature males obtained from Kachemak Bay. It is recognized as a subspecies of Canis lupus in the taxonomic authority Mammal Species of the World (2005).

== Description ==
Geologist Fred Howard Moffit wrote in 1907 that the wolves of the Kenai Peninsula were typically silver-gray and brindle-black in color. Goldman, who only had skulls to go by, described the subspecies in the following terms:

Size large — perhaps the largest of North American wolves; ... No skins available and color undetermined. ... [The skull is] Similar in general to that of pambasileus, but apparently larger, more elongated;... No body measurements available.

The Kenai Peninsula wolf was dependent on the very large moose of the region (hence the trinomial alces, or moose) and Goldman proposed that its large size was an adaption to this.

== History ==
Wolves were common on the Peninsula before 1900, however, gold was discovered there in 1895. Miners, fearing rabies, commenced poisoning, hunting and trapping the wolves and by 1915 they had been extirpated. The Kenai Peninsula wolf went extinct in 1925 or 1955.

Re-population of wolves from other areas onto the peninsula did not occur until the 1960s. It has been shown through DNA studies that, at minimum, the current population of wolves on the Kenai Peninsula mated with other Alaskan subspecies, as the structure of the current wolf population's DNA is similar to other mainland Alaskan subspecies.
