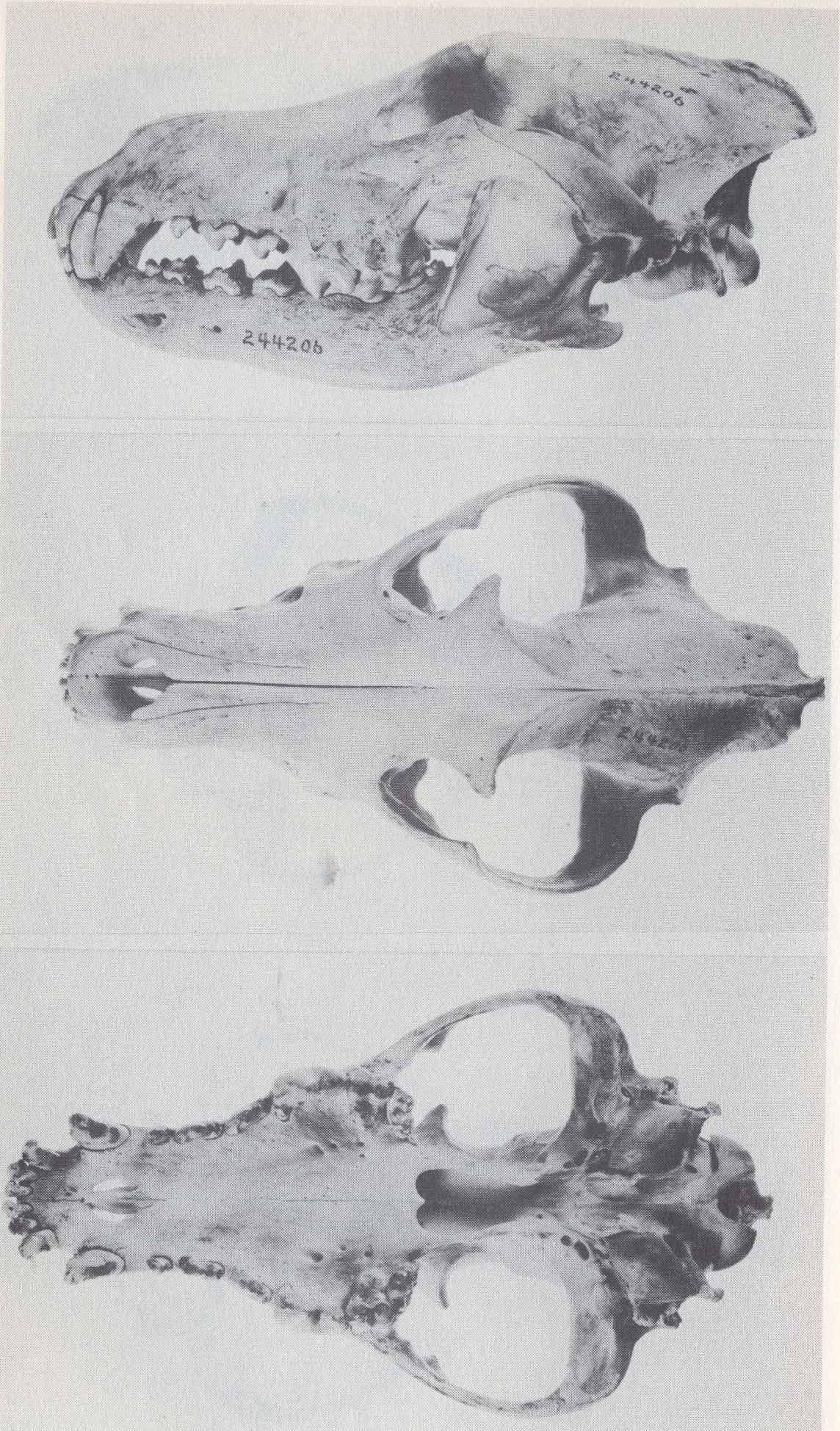

Conservation status
- Vulnerable (NatureServe)

Scientific classification
- Kingdom: Animalia
- Phylum: Chordata
- Class: Mammalia
- Order: Carnivora
- Family: Canidae
- Genus: Canis
- Species: C. lupus
- Subspecies: C. l. ligoni

Trinomial name
- Canis lupus ligoni Goldman, 1937
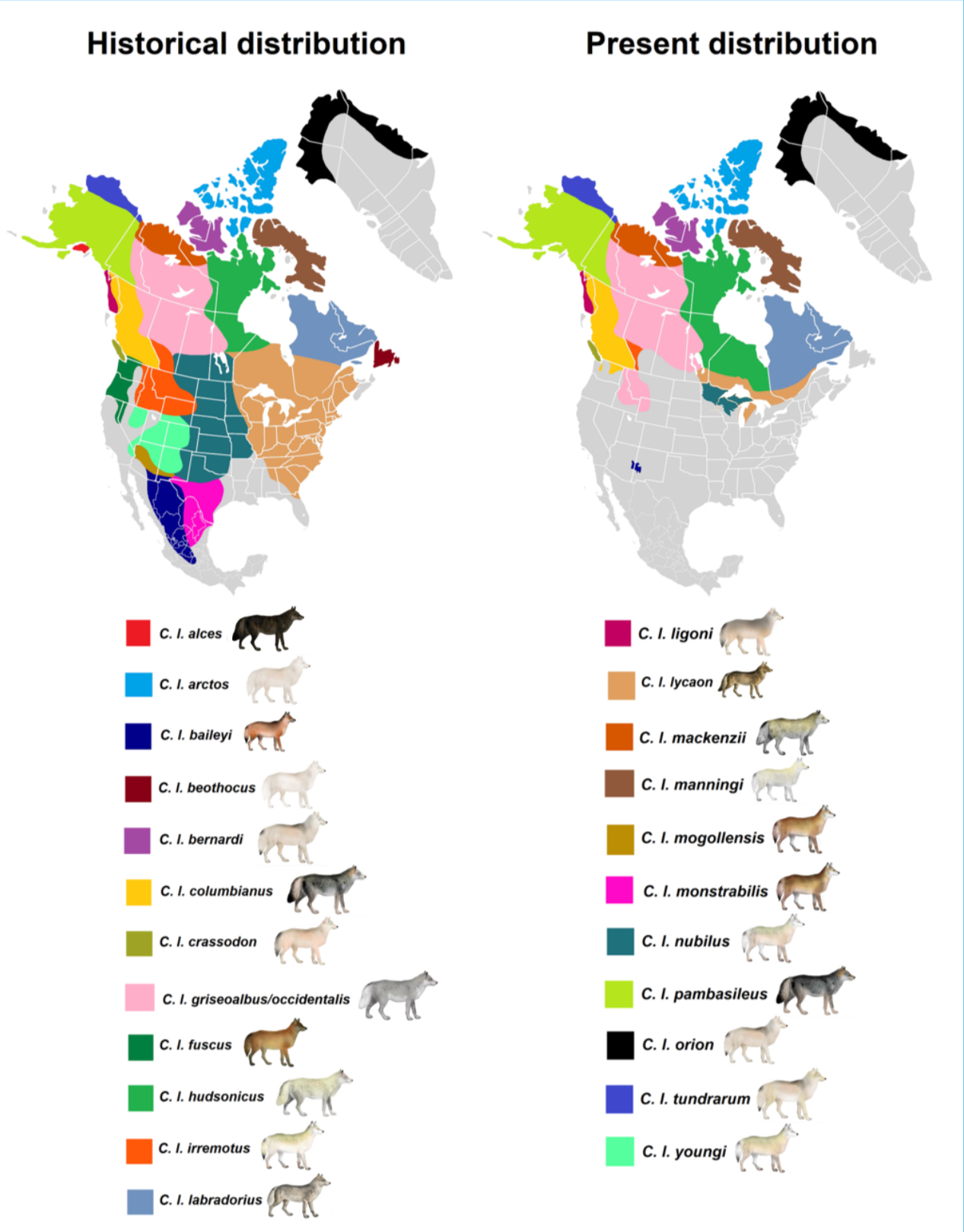
- Historical and present range of gray wolf subspecies in North America

= Alexander Archipelago wolf =

Subspecies of wolf endemic to Alaska

The Alexander Archipelago wolf (Canis lupus ligoni), also known as the Islands wolf, is a subspecies of the gray wolf. The coastal wolves of southeast Alaska inhabit the area that includes the Alexander Archipelago, its islands, and a narrow strip of rugged coastline that is biologically isolated from the rest of North America by the Coast Mountains.

The Tongass National Forest comprises about 80% of the region. In 1993, a petition to list the Alexander Archipelago wolf as threatened under the U.S. Endangered Species Act was lodged with the U.S. Fish and Wildlife Service. The agency decided in 1997 that listing was not warranted at that time. In the interim, a multiagency conservation assessment of the species was published. In 2011, a second petition to list the species as either threatened or endangered was filed with the Fish and Wildlife Service. It referenced scientific studies and other information that had arisen over the intervening 14 years. In March 2014, in response to the petition, the agency made a positive initial finding that listing the species as threatened or endangered "may be warranted" and that it will prepare a formal status review.

== Taxonomy ==
This wolf is recognized as a subspecies of Canis lupus in the taxonomic authority Mammal Species of the World (2005). Early taxonomists were able to determine that the Alexander Archipelago wolf was its own unique subspecies due to "common cranial characteristics". Taxonomists have suggested more recently that the species may have originated from another subspecies known as C. l. nubilus.

Studies using mitochondrial DNA have indicated that the wolves of coastal southeast Alaska are genetically distinct from inland gray wolves, reflecting a pattern also observed in other taxa. They show a phylogenetic relationship with extirpated wolves from the south (Oklahoma), indicating that these wolves are the last remains of a once widespread group that has been largely extirpated during the last century, and that the wolves of northern North America had originally expanded from southern refuges below the Wisconsin glaciation after the ice had melted at the end of the last glacial maximum. These findings call into question the taxonomic classification of C.l. nulibus proposed by Nowak. Another study found that the wolves of coastal British Columbia were genetically and ecologically distinct from the inland wolves, including other wolves from inland British Columbia. A study of the three coastal wolves indicated a close phylogenetic relationship across regions that are geographically and ecologically contiguous, and the study proposed that C. l. ligoni (Alexander Archipelago wolf), C. l. columbianus (British Columbia wolf), and C. l. crassodon (Vancouver Island wolf) should be recognized as a single subspecies of C. lupus.

In 2016, two studies compared the DNA sequences of 42,000 single-nucleotide polymorphisms in North American gray wolves and found the coastal wolves to be genetically and phenotypically distinct from other wolves. They share the same habitat and prey species, and form one of the study's six identified ecotypes - a genetically and ecologically distinct population separated from other populations by their different types of habitat. The local adaptation of a wolf ecotype most likely reflects the wolf's preference to remain in the type of habitat that it was born into. Wolves that prey on fish and small deer in wet, coastal environments tend to be smaller than other wolves.

== Physiology ==
=== Description ===
Typically smaller than the other North American subspecies of gray wolf, the Alexander Archipelago wolf averages between 30 and 50 lb (14 and 23 kg). They are about 3 1/2 ft (1.1 m) long and 2 ft (0.61 m) tall at the shoulder. Their coat is generally a dark gray, with varying patterns of lighter shades. Individuals from different islands in the archipelago have a propensity for different color phases, from pure black to combinations of black and white to a much brighter cinnamon color.

=== Dietary habits ===
The primary prey of this species is the Sitka black-tailed deer, which comprises as much as 90% of an individual's diet. The next-closest consumed species, less than 10%, is the North American beaver. The average Alexander Archipelago wolf eats an estimated 26 deer per year. This habit of feeding almost entirely on a single species is peculiar to this wolf, and is not seen in other North American wolf species. This subspecies consumes large amounts of salmon in addition to deer, beaver, mountain goat, and small mammals. Salmon make up about 10-25% of their diet. Salmon are attributed with allowing the subspecies to have one of the higher pup survivorship rates (90%) of the species.

== Range, population, and repopulation ==
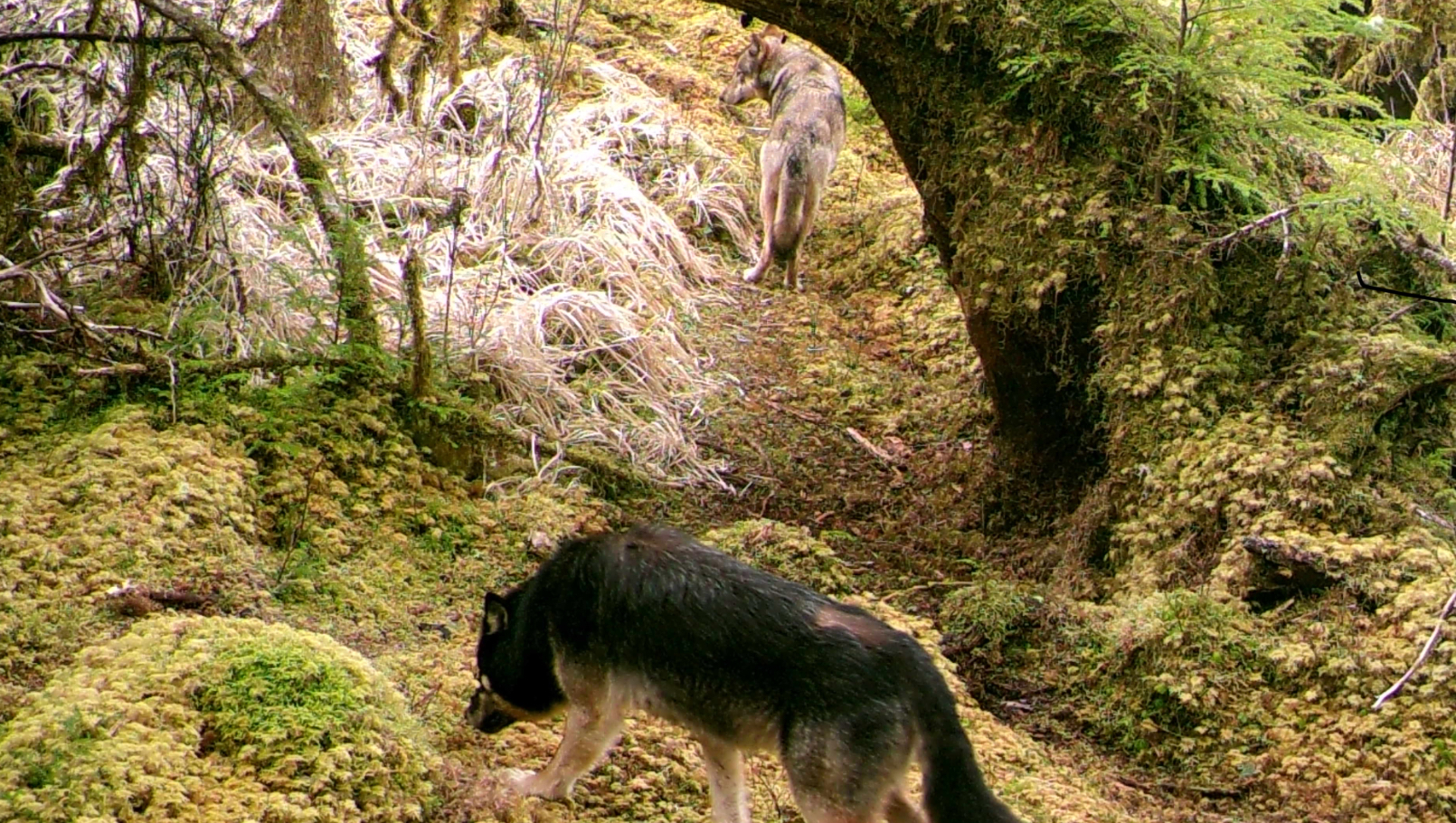
Two Alexander Archipelago wolves in Southeastern Alaska

=== Range ===
The range of C. lupus ligoni covers all of southeastern Alaska (the Alaskan panhandle) except the Admiralty, Baranof, and Chichagof Islands.

A population survey (from a mid-1990s radio-collar study) produced a region-wide estimate of 750 to 1,100 wolves, with the number of wolves in the autumn of 1994 (before trapping season) estimated to be 908. That study was conducted on Prince of Wales Island, with the region-wide estimate being based on an extrapolation on the varying habitat capability for prey. The Prince of Wales population was estimated to be 300–350.

From Environment New Jersey: "The Alexander Archipelago wolf is one of the world's rarest wolf subspecies, and the islands that make up the Tongass National Forest are its only home in the United States. They're severely threatened. In 2014, the wolves' population fell from 200 to around 60 wolves -- a drop of roughly 70 percent in just one year."

During field work in the summer of 2010, the Alaska Department of Fish and Game (ADFG) determined that Prince of Wales Island's wolf population had declined sharply; the ADFG was unable to collect enough wolf scats to make a population estimate based on DNA. Reportedly, "only a 'small fraction' of the expected number of scats" were found during this effort, in which a number of previously known denning sites were checked, and transects were checked over an extensive part of the island. In a regulatory proposal, given at the Alaska Board of Game's November 2010 meeting to help protect the species, ADFG estimated the island's wolf population to be only 150, down by over 50% of the estimated 300–350 wolves from the 1990s radio-collar survey.

=== Reproduction ===
In southeastern Alaska, wolf pups are usually born during the final two weeks of April. Dens are usually constructed 4–5 weeks prior to the birth. Den sites vary by a number of factors, such as the pack in question's home range and available topography; possibilities include burrows dug between the roots of large trees, caves, cliff-base crevices and rock formations, abandoned and dry beaver dams, or other uninhabited animal burrows—which the wolves will further excavate and enlarge.

== History ==
The Alexander Archipelago wolf first arrived in Alaska sometime between 7,000 and 8,000 years ago, after the end of the Wisconsin glaciation period. The species was likely following the migration of the Sitka deer as they traveled north because of geographical and climate change in the area. The first observation of concern for the possible instability of the Alexander Archipelago wolf population was by a USDA Forest Service-sponsored interagency committee. This concern came about because of the extensive logging being conducted in the region's forest, under the Tongass Land Management Plan.

=== Endangered Species Act petition – 1993 to 1997 ===
A petition was presented to the United States Fish and Wildlife Service (FWS) in December 1993 by the Biodiversity Legal Foundation and an independent biologist, requesting the Alexander Archipelago wolf to be listed as a threatened species under the Endangered Species Act. The agency published a positive 90-day finding in the Federal Register on May 20, 1994, but near the end of the year, issued another finding that a "listing is not warranted at this time", but that if the logging was not reduced or reservation areas created, the "long-term viability of the Alexander Archipelago wolf is seriously imperiled." To better assess the status of the species, the FWS ordered a conservation assessment to be made in terms of specific data of the species and its viability for the future.

After the assessment was completed, more studies were undertaken to understand exactly how the Alexander Archipelago wolf fits into the food chain and what effect extensive logging would cause. After study that, between 1995 and 2045, the population of the Alexander Archipelago wolf was surmised to "decline as much as 25%", along with Sitka deer population declining by 28% within the same time.

In 1994, the FWS issued a memo stating, "not protecting the wolf would be the 'least controversial option'". This was in regards to the logging companies and lobbyists that opposed restrictions on logging in the area, which protecting the Alexander Archipelago wolf would create. In 1997, the petition was denied due to the findings that wolves in southeast Alaska would not be in danger of extinction within the foreseeable future.

Jack Ward Thomas wrote in his book, Jack Ward Thomas: the journals of a Forest Service chief, about a meeting held in 1995 in regards to a consideration by the Forest Service to list the Alexander Archipelago wolf and the Queen Charlotte goshawk as threatened. The meeting was between Thomas, Undersecretary James Lyons, Deputy Undersecretary Adela Backiel, and Alaska Regional Forester Phil Janik, all on behalf of the Forest Service, and Ted Stevens, Frank Murkowski, and Don Young. The main argument was from Stevens, Murkowski, and Young, who believed that the Forest Service was trying to purposefully limit the lumber market in Alaska. They demanded that the two species not be listed or that negative legislation would follow, likely resulting in budget and personnel cuts for the Forest Service.

The Tongass Land Management Plan (forest plan) was revised in 1997 after immense pressure from environmental groups to list the Alexander Archipelago wolf as threatened. The plan included a standard and guideline to sustain a habitat carrying capacity of least 18 Sitka deer per square mile to provide adequate prey and to limit the density of roads (i.e. miles of road per square mile). The forest plan also established a system of habitat reserves. On the basis of the new plan, shortly afterward, FWS made a final determination that listing the wolf as threatened was unwarranted.

=== Endangered Species Act petition – 2011 ===
In 2011, a 103-page petition to list the Alexander Archipelago wolf as a threatened or endangered species under the Endangered Species Act was filed with the US Fish and Wildlife Service by the Center for Biological Diversity and Greenpeace on August 10, 2011. The petition requested consideration for a separate listing of the Prince of Wales Island population because it is believed to be a distinct population segment, as well as a listing for the subspecies as a whole.

In March 2014 the agency published a finding in the Federal Register that listing the Alexander Archipelago wolf "may be warranted." The finding was positive on three of the five factors that the Endangered Species Act requires the agency to consider. Those are: "the present or threatened destruction, modification, or curtailment of its habitat or range"; overutilization; and "the inadequacy of existing regulatory mechanisms." In making its finding, the agency opened a 60-day public comment period, after which it will proceed to do a formal status review of the species followed by a final decision on listing. How long that may take is in question. The agencies say several years may be needed to get funding to complete the review, but 3 days after the finding was published, the petitioners notified the agency they intend to sue to expedite the process.

The FWS would prefer to leave management of the wolf with the state, if the state will create a viable plan for wolf conservation; however, the service will list the species if it determines doing so is necessary to protect the species' existence. The supervisor of the Tongass National Forest, Forrest Cole, said the Forest Service will cooperate with the FWS in evaluating the status of the species.

The Alaska Department of Fish and Game's Division of Wildlife Conservation does not believe the Alexander Archipelago wolf is at risk now or threatened with the risk of extinction in the foreseeable future. However, the division's primary researcher on the status of the species, Dr. David Person, who was involved in that effort for 22 years, quit the agency in May 2013 and subsequently wrote a declaration, concerning the Forest Service's Big Thorne timber sale, that the predator-prey ecosystem, including wolves, on Prince of Wales Island is threatened with collapse because of the cumulative impacts of logging and logging roads.

=== Litigation in 2008 ===
Greenpeace and the Cascadia Wildlands Project pointed out in 2008 that data the Forest Service was using were known to be prone to cause overestimation of the carrying capacity for deer, the wolves' primary prey. Furthermore, the conversion factor, known as the "deer multiplier", used in the calculations was incorrectly applied, causing a 30% overestimation of carrying capacity and corresponding underestimation of impacts. The two organizations determined, in total, the carrying capacity for the Sitka deer in places throughout the Tongass had been generally been overestimated by the Forest Service in its timber planning, by as much as 120% (varying geographically due to the faulty data).

In 2008, Greenpeace and the Cascadia Wildlands Project sued to stop the Forest Service from proceeding with four timber sales on the Tongass NF slated to extract around "30 million board-feet of Tongass timber", an amount close to the annual volume then being logged. The sales are on Prince of Wales, Kupreanof, Mitkof, and Revillagigedo Islands. The suit challenged the agency's method of calculating the impact of logging on habitat carrying capacity for deer. In a radio story, the plaintiff's spokesman explained that the data being used to represent habitat quality are actually uncorrelated to habitat quality, and that the deer multiplier mentioned above was misused according to the science under which it was derived. The story points to the Forest Service's underestimation of impacts not only to wolves but to subsistence deer hunters.

In May 2010, US District Judge Ralph Beistline denied the plaintiff's motion for summary judgment, saying he "found no wrongdoing on the part of the Forest Service" and it was a "scientific disagreement". The plaintiffs appealed the decision to the 9th US Circuit Court of Appeals (case 10-35567). A three-judge panel (Arthur Alarcón, Susan Graber, and Jay Bybee) heard oral arguments in the appeal on May 3, 2011 The panel ruled in favor of the plaintiffs on August 2, 2011, reversing in part, vacating in part and remanding the district court's decision. The ruling says, in part:

"We do not think that USFS has adequately explained its decision to approve the four logging projects in the Tongass. ... USFS has failed to explain how it ended up with a table that identifies 100 deer per square mile as a maximum carrying capacity, but allows 130 deer per square mile as a potential carrying capacity. 'The agency is obligated to articulate a rational connection between the facts found and the choices made,' which the agency has not done here. Pac. Coast Fed'n of Fisherman's Ass'ns v. U.S. Bureau of Reclamation, 426 F.3d 1082, 1091 (9th Cir. 2005)..."

"We have similar questions about USFS's use of VolStrata data, which identifies total timber volume and not forest structure, to approve the projects, where forest structure—and not total timber volume—is relevant to the habitability of a piece of land. USFS itself has recognized the limitations in the VolStrata data. ... Because we must remand to the agency to re-examine its Deer Model, we need not decide whether the use of the VolStrata data was arbitrary and capricious. We anticipate that, in reviewing the proposed projects, USFS will use the best available data ..."

In a statement to the press, a spokesman for the plaintiffs said the principles in this lawsuit apply to every significant timber sale between 1996 and 2008 before the Forest Service corrected errors in the deer model when the agency issued its revised Tongass Forest Plan, but, he said, the agency still fails to address cumulative impacts to deer, especially on Prince of Wales Island, as challenged in the Logjam timber sale lawsuit. He also said, "The purpose of the lawsuit is to make the Forest Service go back and do its analysis right on these timber sales. And we believe that when the Forest Service does that, that it can't justify the volume of the timber that it decided to log in these projects."

=== Litigation filed in 2010 ===
In January 2010, the Forest Service was sued over its 73 million-board-ft Logjam timber sale on Prince of Wales Island, by Tongass Conservation Society, Cascadia Wildlands, and Greenpeace. At issue is the impact of excessive road density on wolf mortality and further loss of habitat for the primary prey (deer), among other issues. The plaintiff's motion for summary judgement was denied by the US District Court, Alaska, in September, and the case has been appealed to the 9th US Circuit Court of Appeals. The court scheduled oral arguments before Judges Betty Fletcher, Andrew Kleinfeld, and Consuelo Callahan for July 29, 2011, sitting in Anchorage.

=== Endangered Species Act petition – 2023 ===
The petition was filled by environmental groups concerned about wolves on Prince of Wales Island where they are subject to legal hunting and trapping. The U.S. Fish and Wildlife Service found in 2023 that it was not currently warranted.

== See also ==
- Wolf population differences
