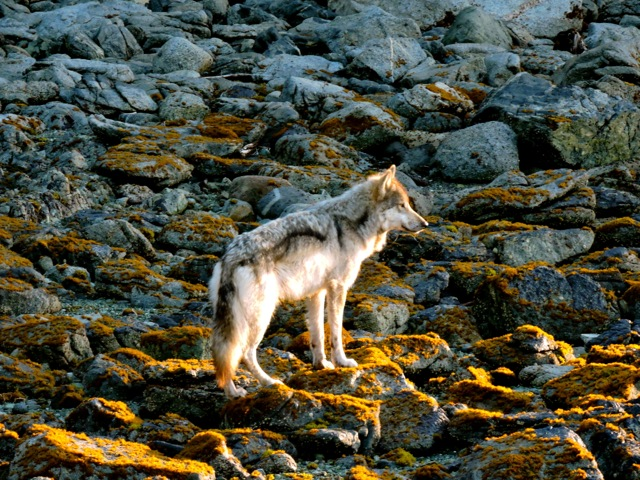
- A Vancouver Island wolf in Clayoquot Sound.

Conservation status
- Least Concern (IUCN 3.1)

Scientific classification
- Kingdom: Animalia
- Phylum: Chordata
- Class: Mammalia
- Order: Carnivora
- Family: Canidae
- Genus: Canis
- Species: C. lupus
- Subspecies: C. l. crassodon

Trinomial name
- Canis lupus crassodon Hall, 1932
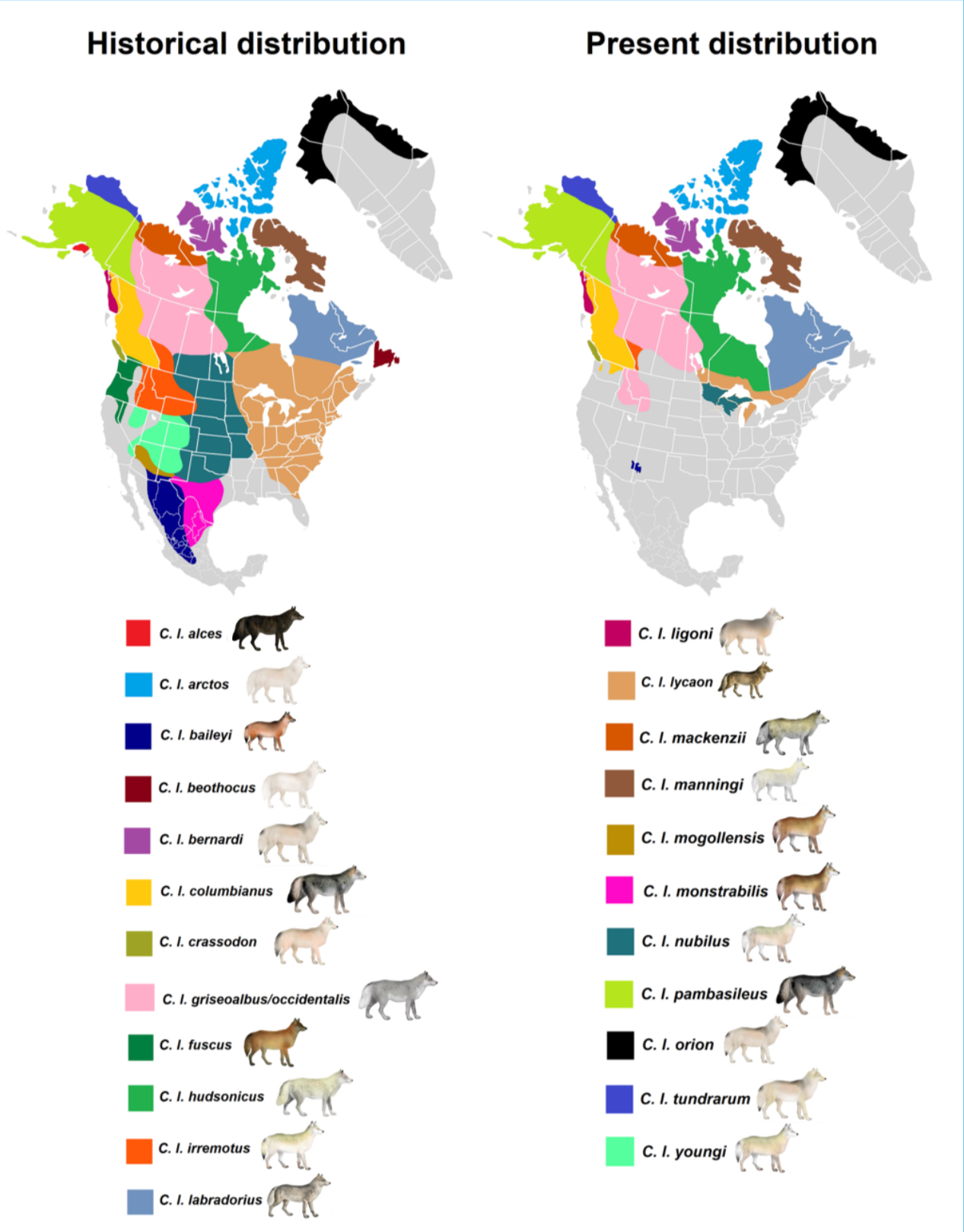
- Historical and present range of grey wolf subspecies in North America.

Synonyms
- Canis crassodon crassodon

= Vancouver Coastal Sea wolf =

Vancouver Island wolf

Subspecies of carnivore

The Vancouver Coastal sea wolf, also known as the Vancouver Island wolf, coastal wolf or sea wolf (Canis lupus crassodon) is a subspecies of gray wolf endemic to the coast of the Pacific Northwest. They are a unique subspecies of wolf due to their semi-aquatic lifestyle, which includes a diet that is almost entirely marine-based.

The wolves play important roles in the cultures and spiritual beliefs of local indigenous people, with mythical creatures like the Gonakadet and Wasgo, found among the Tsimshian, Tlingit, and Haida peoples of British Columbia and Alaska, being inspired by them.

== Description ==
Vancouver Island wolves measure between 1.2 and 1.5 metres (4 and 5 ft) from nose to tail-tip, and are noticeably lighter than their interior counterparts, weighing between 29 and 40 kilos (65-90lbs), as opposed to the 36 to 68 kilos (80-150lbs) of a mainland British Columbia wolf. As with other wolves, there is a difference in size between the sexes, with males being larger than females.

The colour of their coat ranges between individuals, with varying degrees of reddish-brown, grey, beige, and white fur, though entirely white and melanistic individuals are seen on occasion.

== Range ==
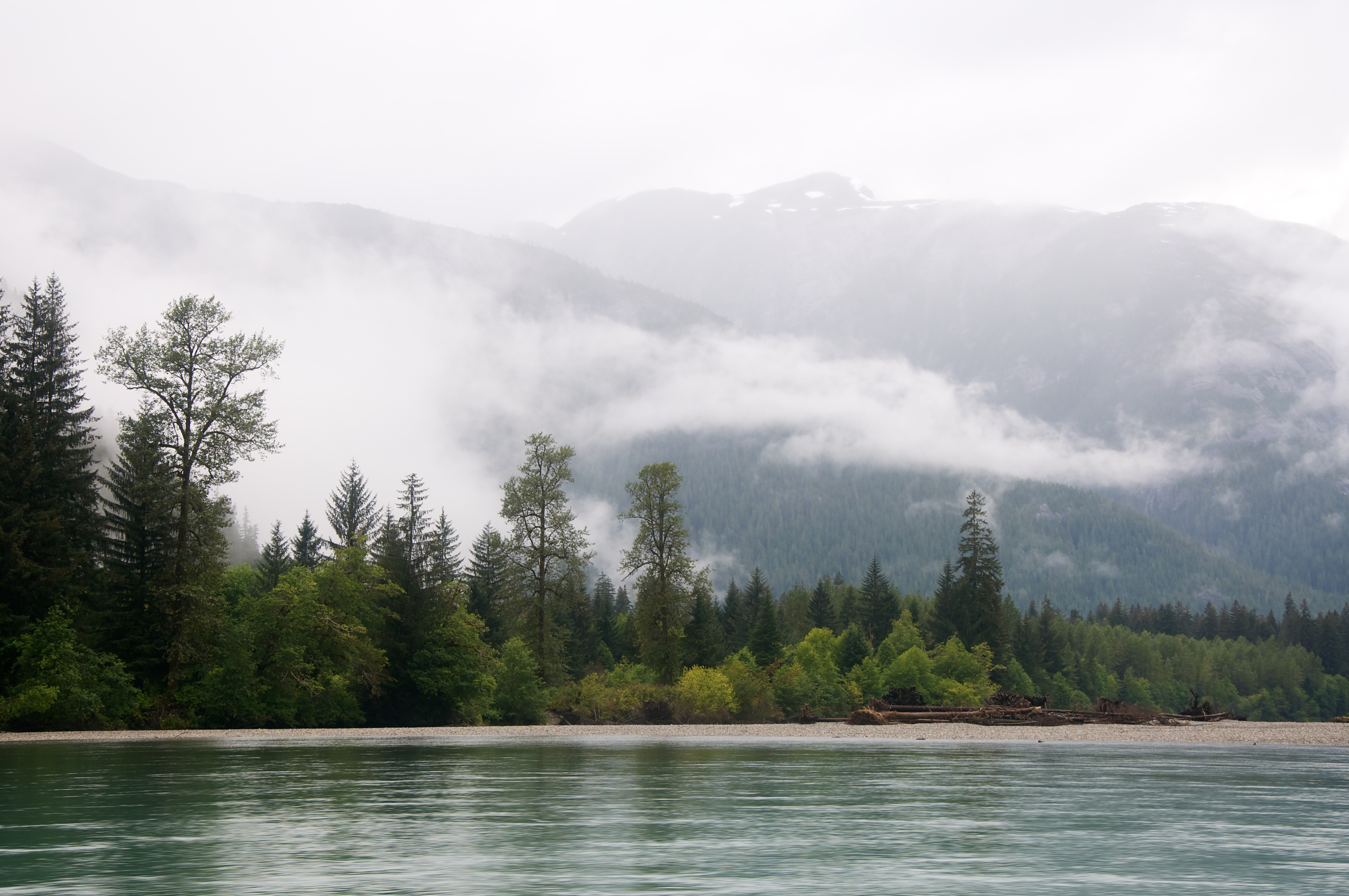
Kitlope Heritage Conservancy, part of the Great Bear Rainforest.

Vancouver Island wolves range from southern Alaska, down along the coast of British Columbia, including within the Great Bear Rainforest. Owing to their propensity as strong swimmers, they also inhabit several islands in the Salish Sea, including their namesake, Vancouver Island.

== Behaviour ==
One of the defining features of this subspecies is their movements between islands, in some cases swimming up to 12 kilometres (7.5 miles) between landmasses. These movements are sometimes seasonal, including following the migration of salmon, one of their preferred food sources.

Vancouver Island wolves have a diverse diet, with between 75 and 90 percent of it being sourced from the ocean. A quarter of that is salmon, of which the wolves are documented eating solely the heads, potentially to avoid a bacterial infection known as "salmon poisoning" which can be fatal to canids.

Along the coast, they will forage for barnacles, clams, mussels, and crabs, digging into the sand with their paws and using powerful jaw muscles to break open shells. They also scavenge whatever has been left behind by the tide, which can include everything from abalone to whale carcasses. They have been found to tug crab trap floats ashore in order to retrieve the bait, an undertaking described as "highly efficient and focused behaviour".

Coastal wolves will also actively hunt marine mammals like otters, seals, and their offspring, as well as terrestrial mammals like black-tailed deer. River otters, as well as minks, appear more often as the chosen food source when the availability of terrestrial mammals decreases. The wolves' diet varies as the seasons and scarcity of food sources change. They primarily feed on deer fawns and elk in the summer months while turning to beaver as a food source in the winter season.

Additionally, age plays a part in the dietary differences of coastal wolves. Young pups consume a larger quantity of deer fawns, rather than adult deer, because it is theorized that the smaller prey is easier for adult wolves to transport to their offspring.

== Taxonomy and genetics ==
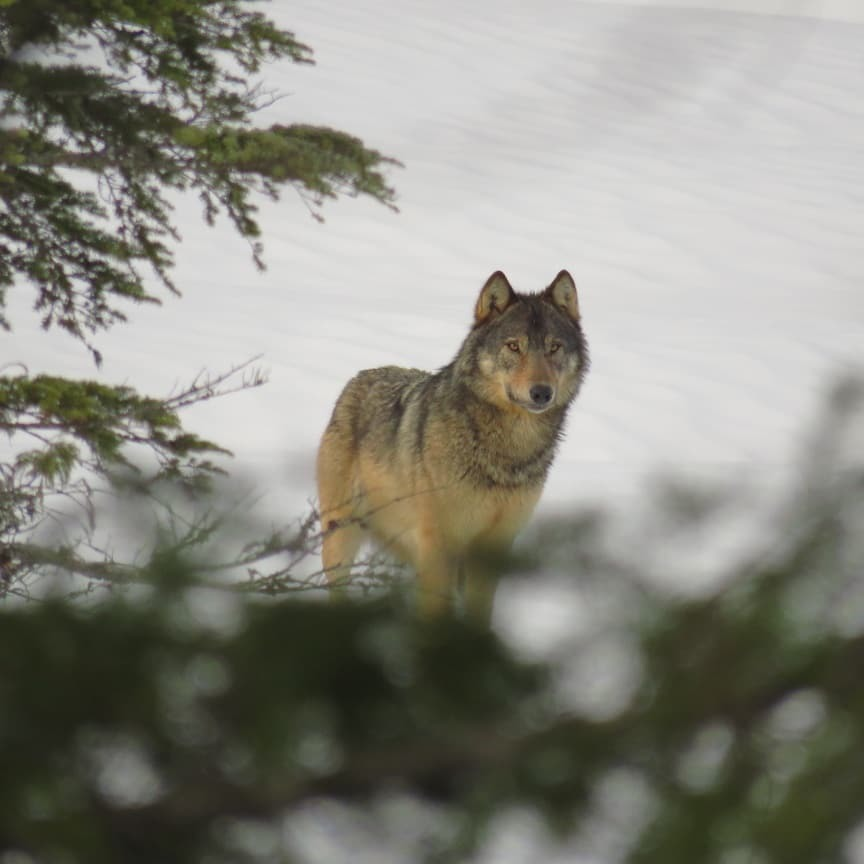
A Vancouver Island wolf in the Comox Valley.

The Vancouver Island wolf is recognized as a subspecies of Canis lupus in the taxonomic authority Mammal Species of the World (2005). Studies using mitochondrial DNA have indicated that the wolves of coastal southeast Alaska are genetically distinct from inland grey wolves, reflecting a pattern also observed in other taxa. They show a phylogenetic relationship with extirpated wolves from the south (Oklahoma), indicating that these wolves are the last remains of a once widespread group that has been largely extirpated during the last century and that the wolves of northern North America had originally expanded from southern refuges below the Wisconsin glaciation after the ice had melted at the end of the Last Glacial Maximum. These findings call into question the taxonomic classification of C. l. nulibus proposed by Nowak. Another study found that the wolves of coastal British Columbia were genetically and ecologically distinct from the inland wolves, including other wolves from inland British Columbia. A study of the three coastal wolves indicated a close phylogenetic relationship across regions that are geographically and ecologically contiguous, and the study proposed that Canis lupus ligoni (Alexander Archipelago wolf), Canis lupus columbianus (British Columbia wolf), and Canis lupus crassodon (Vancouver Island wolf) should be recognized as a single subspecies of Canis lupus.

In 2016, two studies compared the DNA sequences of 42,000 single nucleotide polymorphisms in North American grey wolves and found the coastal wolves to be genetically and phenotypically distinct from other wolves. They share the same habitat and prey species, and form one of the study's six identified ecotypes - a genetically and ecologically distinct population separated from other populations by their different type of habitat. The local adaptation of a wolf ecotype most likely reflects the wolf's preference to remain in the type of habitat that it was born into. Wolves that prey on fish and small deer in wet, coastal environments tend to be smaller than other wolves.

== Conservation ==
The pressure commercial hunting puts on Vancouver Island wolves was brought to international attention when "Takaya", a male wolf whose uniquely solitary life was heavily documented, including in the 2019 documentary Takaya: Lone Wolf, was shot and killed on March 24, 2020, by a hunter. His death prompted calls from both the local and international community for changes to the law regarding the hunting of wolves in British Columbia.

The B.C. Ministry of Forests strictly regulates the hunting of these wolves, with specific limits during trapping and hunting seasons to prevent the depletion of the populations. Plans have been put in place to more closely monitor the species and centralize information gathered from research, harvest reports, and observational records. A two-zone management framework has also been established. In regions where wolves are a significant cause of the decline of threatened wildlife populations, particularly endangered boreal woodland caribou (Rangifer tarandus caribou), targeted removal of these wolves may be used as a last-resort conservation measure for the surrounding species. On the other hand, in areas where wolves do not pose a threat, the populations are left to exist naturally within the ecosystem, maintaining their ecological role as predators.

Human-wildlife conflict presents a growing challenge for the wolves, particularly on Vancouver Island, a prominent tourist destination. Once extirpated from the island in the late 1960s, the wolves began reappearing in the early 1970s. During this absence public perception of the wolves had changed, resulting in more fascination of the Vancouver Island wolves. This interest has led to unintended consequences, in 2000 on Vargas Island the wolves became habituated to human activity, resulting in wolves being hand-fed by tourists. Urbanization and logging practices also put pressures on coastal wolf populations, with increasing encounters with humans and their pets often leading to more habituation. This can result in lethal human-wolf interactions, such as wolves approaching people or pets. Logging activities have also changed the availability of preferred prey sources for Vancouver wolves, resulting in wolves moving further inland.
