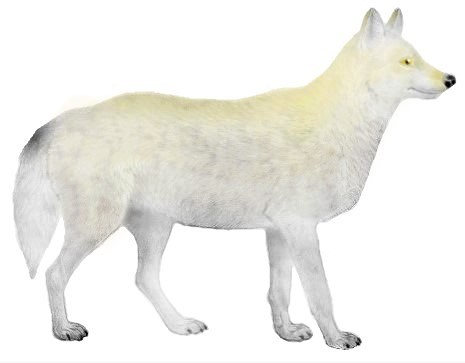
- Illustration based on a description by Edward Alphonso Goldman

Conservation status
- Secure (NatureServe)

Scientific classification
- Kingdom: Animalia
- Phylum: Chordata
- Class: Mammalia
- Order: Carnivora
- Family: Canidae
- Genus: Canis
- Species: C. lupus
- Subspecies: C. l. manningi

Trinomial name
- Canis lupus manningi Anderson, 1943 (1908)
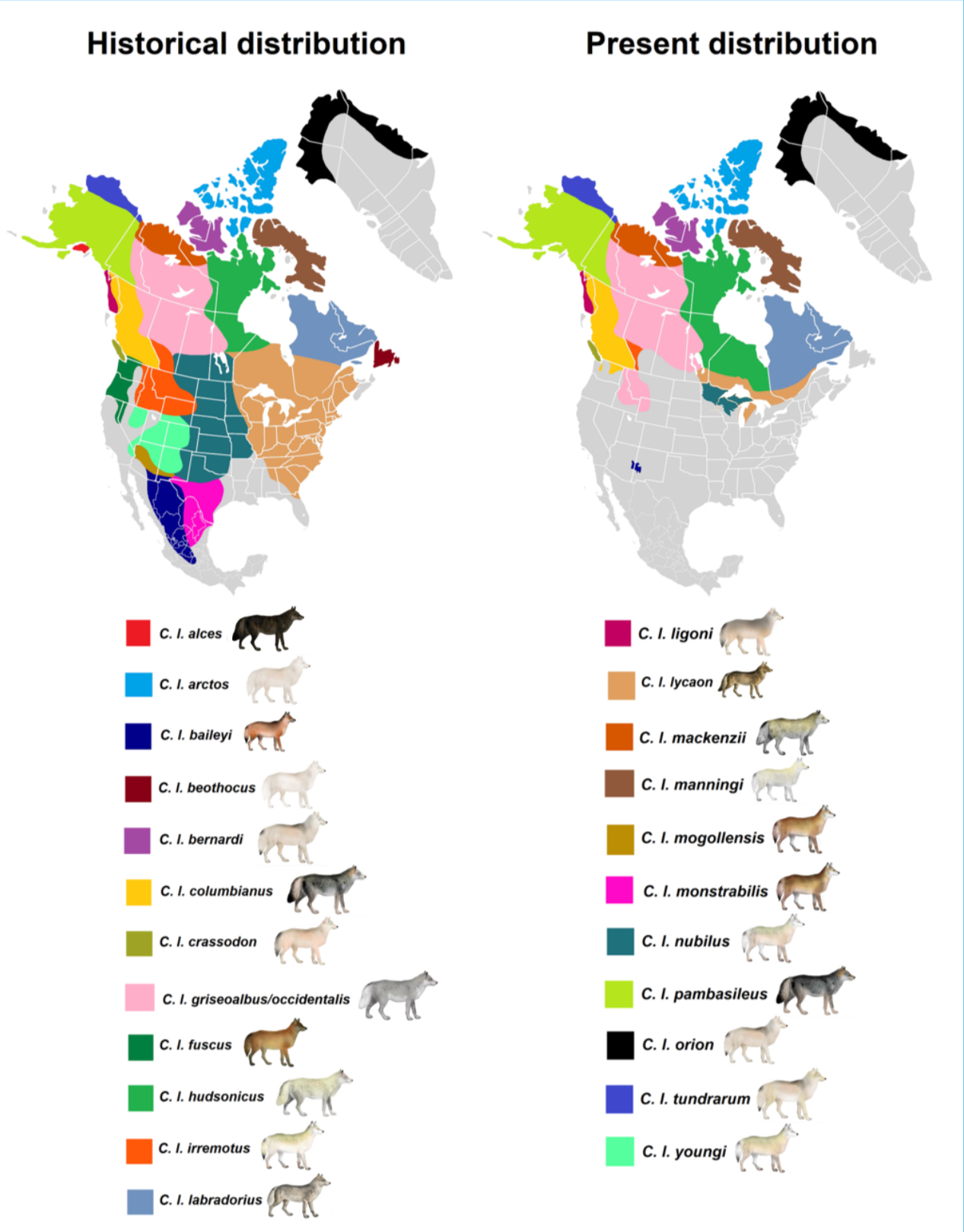
- Historical and present range of grey wolf subspecies in North America

Synonyms
- Canis albus manningi

= Baffin Island wolf =

Subspecies of carnivore

The Baffin Island wolf (Canis lupus manningi), also known as the Baffin Island tundra wolf, is a subspecies of grey wolf which resides exclusively on Baffin Island and several nearby islands. It was not formally recognized as a subspecies until 1943, when it was given its taxonomic classification by Anderson. This wolf is recognized as a subspecies of Canis lupus in the taxonomic authority Mammal Species of the World (2005).

== Physiology ==
=== Description ===
The Baffin Island wolf is described as being light coloured, sometimes white, and unusually small, as compared to other wolf subspecies. It is proposed to be the smallest of all Arctic wolf types. It is currently endangered.

== History ==
Early records and evidence suggest that the wolves in western Greenland migrated there from Baffin Island and are, thus, descendants of the Baffin Island wolf subspecies.

In 1966, a study was conducted on the Baffin Island wolf, of which a preliminary assessment had been made the year before in 1965 at Wordie Bay, by the University of Toronto. It was helped by students from the university as well.
