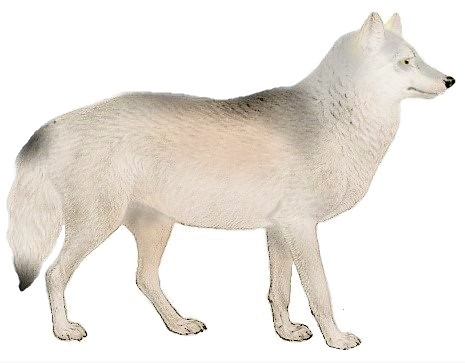

Conservation status
- Extinct (1952) (IUCN 3.1)

Scientific classification
- Kingdom: Animalia
- Phylum: Chordata
- Class: Mammalia
- Order: Carnivora
- Family: Canidae
- Genus: Canis
- Species: C. lupus
- Subspecies: †C. l. bernardi

Trinomial name
- †Canis lupus bernardi Anderson, 1943
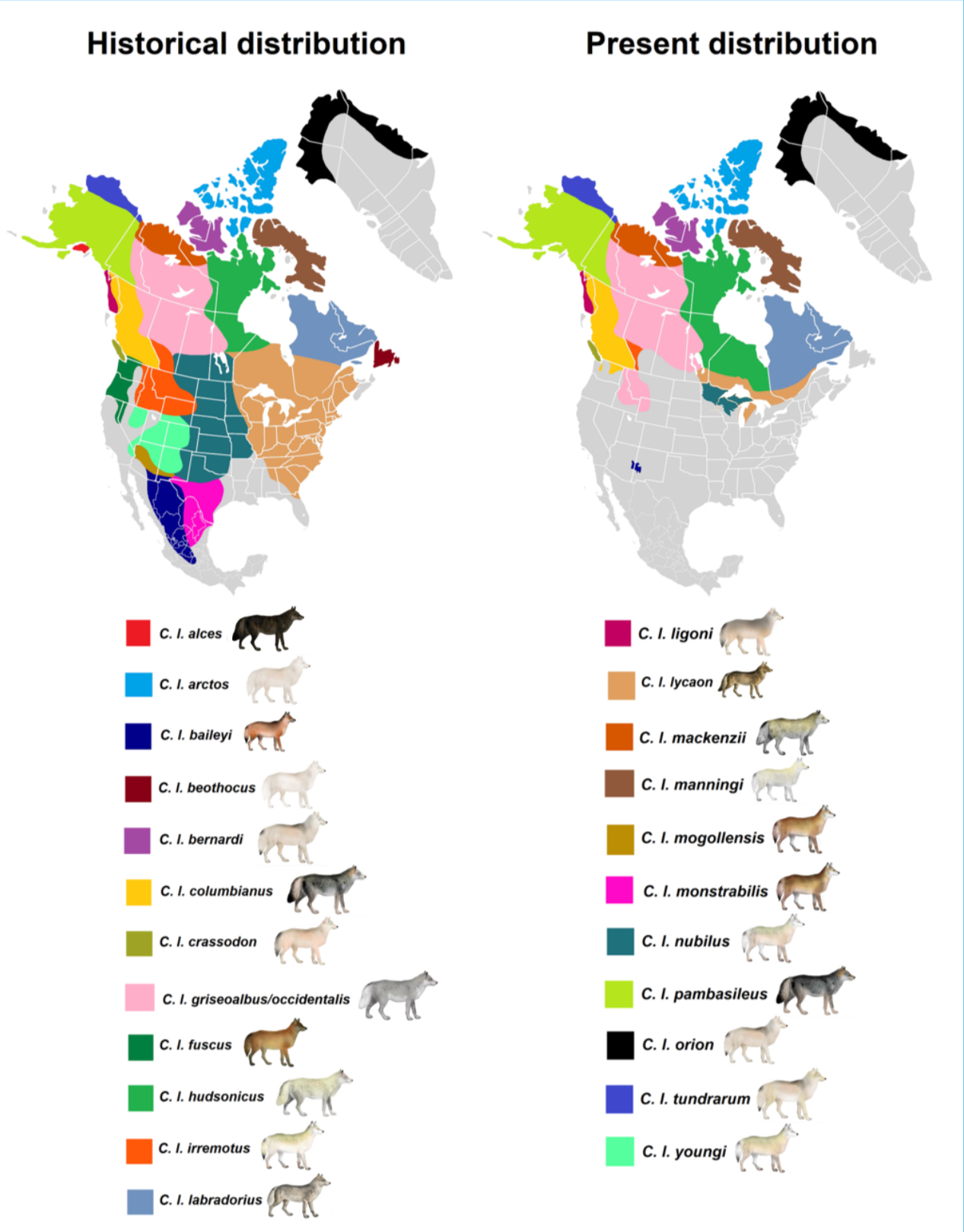
- Historical and present range of gray wolf subspecies in North America

Synonyms
- Canis lupus banksianus (Anderson, 1943)

= Bernard's wolf =

Extinct subspecies of the gray wolf in the Canadian Arctic

Bernard's wolf (Canis lupus bernardi), also known as the Banks Island wolf or the Banks Island tundra wolf, is an extinct subspecies of the gray wolf that was limited to Banks and Victoria Island of the Arctic Archipelago.

== Taxonomy ==
It is recognized as a subspecies of Canis lupus in the taxonomic authority Mammal Species of the World (2005). It was formally discovered, classified, and named after Peter Bernard, sailing master of the gas schooner Mary Sachs of the Canadian Arctic Expedition and collected four other specimens of Canis lupus bernardi, and Joseph F. Bernard, his nephew, who made voyages into the Arctic as master of the gas schooner Teddy Bear, after an adult male skin and skull was collected by them and brought to the National Museum of Canada. There were very few specimens of the subspecies that were recovered, around three or four in total.

== Description ==
The wolf was described as "white with black-tipped hair along the ridge of the back". It is a large rangy wolf, with long narrow skull, slender rostrum and extremely large upper and lower carnassials.

== Extinction ==
A survey was conducted in March 1993 by the Department of Renewable Resources that was to catalog the wolf and caribou populations of the area. While a number of caribou were found and recorded, along with many other indigenous animal species, not a single wolf was found. The Victoria Island population is believed to have become extinct between 1918 and 1952, with one source proposing around 1920.
