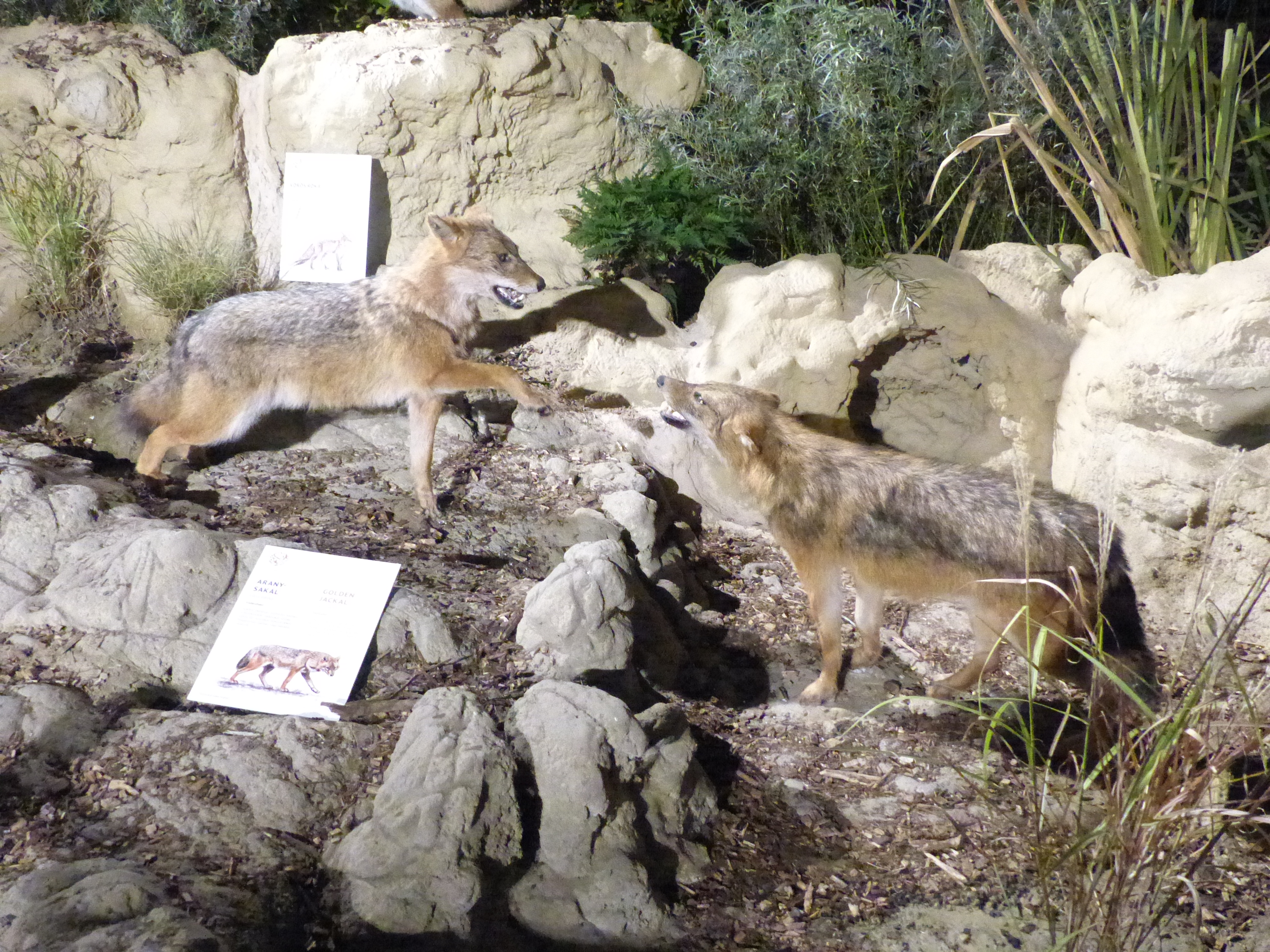
- Taxidermied jackals in Hungary

Scientific classification
- Kingdom: Animalia
- Phylum: Chordata
- Class: Mammalia
- Order: Carnivora
- Family: Canidae
- Genus: Canis
- Species: C. aureus
- Subspecies: C. a. ecsedensis

Trinomial name
- Canis aureus ecsedensis Kretzoi, 1947
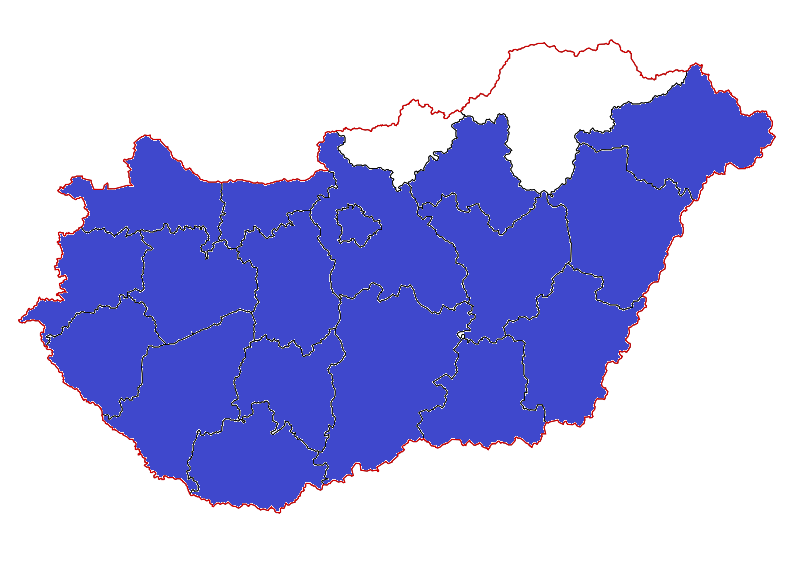
- Range of Canis aureus ecsedensis

Synonyms
- Canis aureus hungaricus Éhik, 1937; Canis aureus balcanicus Brusina, 1892

= Pannonian jackal =

Subspecies of canid

The Pannonian jackal or Balkan jackal (Canis aureus ecsedensis) is a subspecies of golden jackal native to Hungary.

== Taxonomy ==
The Pannonian jackal was described as Canis aureus hungaricus by Gyula Éhik. Éhik differentiated the jackal and the reed wolf (referred as Canis aureus minor in the paper). The type specimen was an individual who was shot in January 1937 by elementary school principal Lajos Nasser in Tyukod. The canid's identity was previously discussed by Éhik and Nasser, until it was discovered that the canid was a golden jackal.

The name Canis aureus hungaricus became a nomen oblitum in favor of the name Canis aureus ecsendensis, proposed by Miklós Kretzoi in 1947.

== Distribution ==
Pannonian jackals are the jackal variety found in Hungary.
