= Austro-Hungarian wolf =

Austro-Hungarian wolf (reed wolf) Temporal range: 0.7–0 Ma Middle Pleistocene – recent

Scientific classification
- Domain: Eukaryota
- Kingdom: Animalia
- Phylum: Chordata
- Class: Mammalia
- Order: Carnivora
- Family: Canidae
- Genus: Canis
- Species: C. lupus
- Subspecies: †C. l. minor

Trinomial name
- †Canis lupus minor M. Mojsisovics, 1887

Subspecies of carnivore

The Austro-Hungarian wolf, also called the reed wolf, common reed wolf, grey reed wolf or Hungarian reed wolf (Hungarian: nádifarkas, German: Rohrwolf), is a wolf or wolf-like animal that is thought to have once inhabited present-day Hungary (possibly also present-day Slovakia) and eastern present-day Austria. It is generally assumed to have gone extinct before 1900 or in the early 20th century.

The status of the reed wolf is uncertain, as there are few records and no uncontroversial remains. It could have been:

- a small-sized wolf, i.e. a part of the species Canis lupus (usually classified either as the separate subspecies Canis lupus minor Mojsisovics, 1897 [non Ogerien, 1863], or as part of the subspecies Canis lupus campestris), or
- a large-sized golden jackal, i.e. a part of the species Canis aureus (usually classified as part of the subspecies Canis aureus ecsedensis, which was formerly known as Canis aureus hungaricus Éhik, 1938 [non Margo, 1891] and which is today often included in the subspecies Canis aureus moreoticus).

Some of the alleged reed wolves were (primarily in the 20th century) identified as wolves (Canis lupus) or as domestic dogs (Canis lupus f. familiaris/ Canis familiaris), therefore reed wolves are currently usually preferably considered to have been some form of Canis lupus. It is also possible that the reed wolf was a combination of all the previous possibilities, i.e. some of the reed wolves were actually part of Canis lupus, some were part of Canis aureus, and some were dogs.

The taxon Canis lupus minor Mojsisovics, 1897, which is the reed wolf, is not to be confused with the unrelated taxon Canis lupus minor Ogerien, 1863, which is now considered a synonym of Canis lupus lupus.
