= Mammal Species of the World =

Zoological reference book

Pie chart of mammal species

Mammal Species of the World: A Taxonomic and Geographic Reference (MSW) is a standard reference work in mammalogy giving descriptions and bibliographic data for the known species of mammals. It is now in its third edition, published in late 2005, which was edited by Don E. Wilson and DeeAnn M. Reeder. An online version is hosted by Bucknell University (see "External links" below).

The Checklist Committee of the American Society of Mammalogists was charged with compiling and updating MSW. In its Annual Report for 2015, the Committee noted that it is under contract with Johns Hopkins Press for the 4th edition of MSW, which will be edited by DeeAnn M. Reeder and Kristofer M. Helgen. The database was made editable for the authors, with the intention of more frequent website updates. The 4th edition was initially expected to be published in 2017, and then deferred until 2019, which had yet to be published as of 2025. The Checklist Committee has since been repurposed into the Biodiversity Committee, which in 2018 released and now maintains the Mammal Diversity Database.
