= Tappan Gregory =

American lawyer and naturalist

Arthur Tappan Gregory (1886– April 30, 1961) was an American lawyer and naturalist. In the legal profession, he served as president of the Chicago Bar Association (1939–1940), Illinois State Bar Association (1945–1946), and the American Bar Association (1947–48). Outside of law, he was an accomplished nature photographer and mammalogist, involved with the Chicago Academy of Sciences. He also served as president of the Izaak Walton League of America. Gregory's wolf, the sole living subspecies of the red wolf, is named for him.

== Early life ==
Gregory was born in 1886, a son of Stephen S. Gregory Sr. and Janet M. Gregory (née Tappan). He was a maternal great-grandson of Arthur Tappan. Gregory was the older brother of Stephen S. Gregory Jr., an investment advisor and noted naturalist. He also had a sister, Charlotte.

Gregory received a bachelor of arts degree from Yale in 1910. He received a bachelor of laws degree from Northwestern University in 1912.

== Legal career ==
Gregory worked as a lawyer at the firm of Bayley, Webster, Gregory, and Hunter (later renamed "Gregory, Gilruth, and Hunter").

Gregory briefly paused his legal career during World War I, in which he sered from 1917 through 1919 313th Field Artillery in the American Expeditionary Forces, in which he held the rank of 1st lieutenant.

Gregory was president of the Chicago Bar Association (1939–1940), the Illinois State Bar Association (1945–1946), and the American Bar Association (1947–48).

In 1942, Gregory was appointed to supervise the refunding of $6 million in overcharges to gas utility users in the Chicago region. In 1946, Gregory served as an observer and photographer during the Nuremberg trials. Gregory served on the Illinois Parole and Pardon Board (the state parole board). He held his seat until it expired in January 1957, with Chicago lawyer John J. Lyons succeeding him thereafter.

== Nature photography and studies ==
In addition to his work in the legal field, Gregory was a naturalist known for his work as a mammalogist and nature photography. He was one of the first photographers to utilize the so-called "self-portrait flash photography" method of capturing photographs of wild animals, in which animals would be baited to a tripwire that would trigger a camera to photograph them. Gregory's wolf, the sole living subspecies of the red wolf, is named for him.

Gregory wrote numerous works published in natural science publications. He as a founding member of the Kennicott Club at the Chicago Academy of Sciences. At the Chicago Academy of Sciecnces, Gregory also served as a scientific governor and honorary curator of mammalogy. Gregory served as president of the Izaak Walton League of America. He was also a member of the American Forestry Association, American Society of Mammalogists, American Ornithological Union, National Wildlife Federation, Photographic Society of America.

Gregory assembled a private collection of mammal skin, which was donated upon his death in 1961 to the Chicago Academy of Sciences.

== Death ==
Gregory died at the age of 74 on April 30, 1961, at Presbyterian-St. Luke's Hospital. At the time of his death, he had been living in Northbrook, Illinois.
