= Stephen S. Gregory Jr. =

American investment advisor and ornithologist

1911 portrait photograph of Gregory

Stephen Strong Gregory Jr. (May 20, 1888–December 20, 1964) was an American investment advisor and ornithologist. He served in the leadership of a number of naturalist organizations. He assembled a significant collection of 4,000 well-preserved ornithological specimens which was largely donated to the Chicago Academy of Sciences after his passing.

== Early life ==
Gregory was born May 20, 1888, a son of Stephen S. Gregory Sr. and Janet M. Gregory (née Tappan). He was a maternal great-grandson of Arthur Tappan. Gregory was the younger brother of Tappan Gregory, a lawyer and fellow naturalist. He also had a sister, Charlotte.

Gregory attended the Latin School of Chicago. He graduated with a bachelor of arts from Yale in 1911, and from University of Wisconsin with a master of engineering in 1913.

== Investment career ==
Gregory worked as an investment advisor. He founded and served as president of the firm Gregory, De Long and Holt, Inc.

== Ornithology ==
Gregory was an accomplished ornithologist. In his early years, he developed an interest in ornithology, compiling fieldnotes on bird migration.

=== Organizations involved in ===
Gregory was highly active in a number of scientific organizations. He was long involved with the American Ornithological Union (AOU). He aided the organization with his business connections and expertise, serving on various financial committees between 1943 and 1960. He served on the Endowment Committee (1943–1949), Finance Committee (1951–1954). He was chairman of the Investing Trustees (1956–1960).

Gregory and his brother, Tappan, were both founding members of the Kennicott Club at the Chicago Academy of Sciences. It was founded on April 28, 1930. He served as a counsellor of the Kennicott Club (1930–1932 and 1933-1934), and served as its vice president (1932–1933) and president (1933–1934).

Gregory also served as president of the Chicago Ornithological Society and a director of the Illinois Audubon Society. He was also a member of the American Society of Mammalogists, and served as one of its three investing trustees during his final six years of life. He was also involved in the Wilson Ornithological Society and Cooper Ornithological Society.

=== Collection ===
In 1919, Gregory started a personal study collection of specimen, shooting his first bird, a Clapper Rail, in Mississippi. He collected many specimens. He further purchased specimens and entire collections, from other collectors, including Ruthven Deane, Benjamin T. Gault, and Charles D. Klotz. His full collection contained 4,000 bird specimens at the time of his death. Gregory kept his well-preserved collection at his residence in Northbrook, Illinois.

Gregory's widow donated most of the collection to the Chicago Academy of Sciences. The exception was 240 skins from Michigan (primarily from the Huron Mountains region), which were instead donated to the Museum of Zoology at the University of Michigan in Ann Arbor.

== Personal life and death ==
Gregory was married on April 19, 1917, to Jean W. Stirling (who took his surname).

After several years of ill health, Gregory died on December 20, 1964, at his residence. He was survived by his widow and their three wedded daughters, Janet G. Kahler, Ann G. Merrill, Dorothy Kahler.
