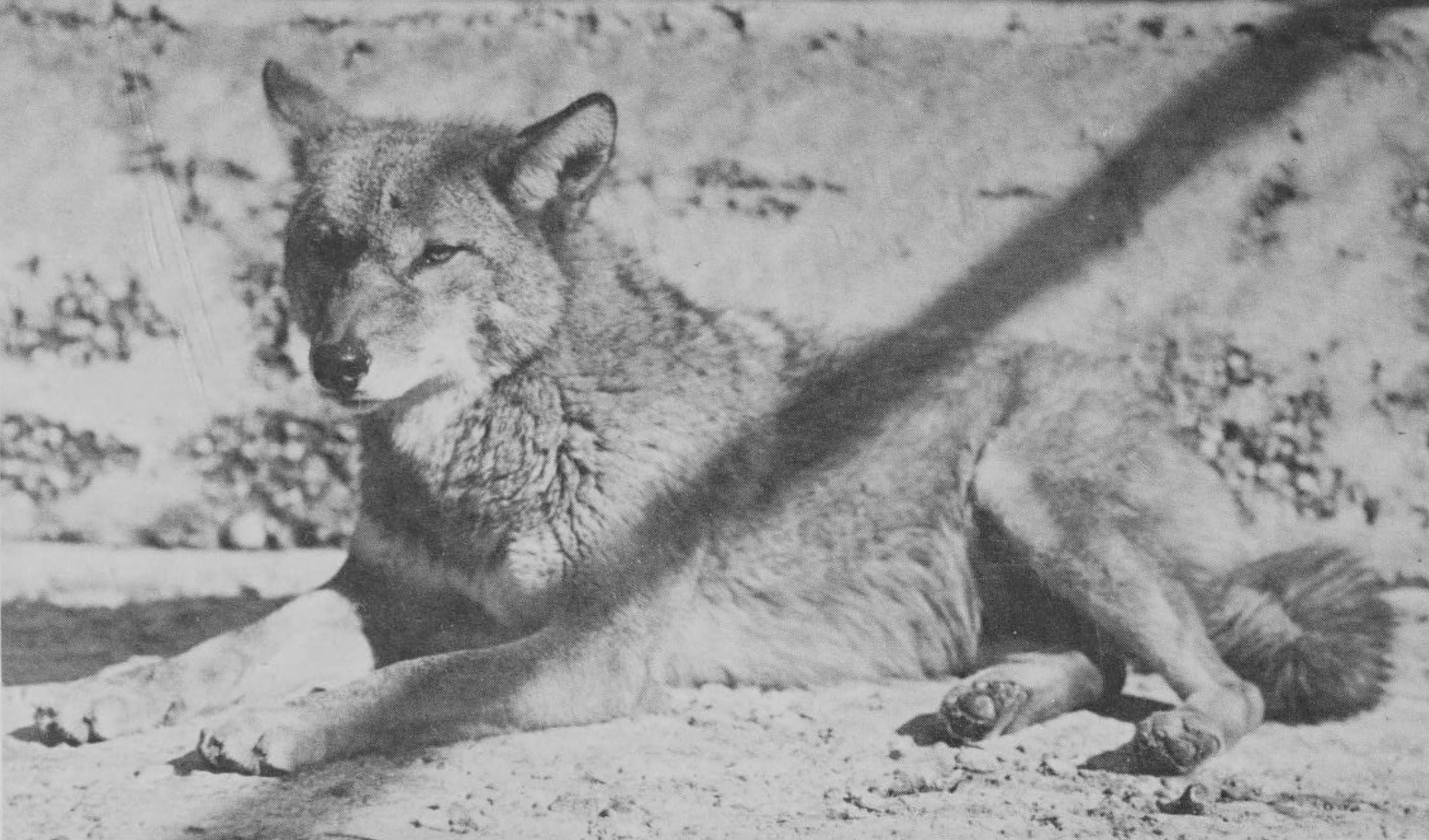
- An individual in Texas in 1944

Conservation status
- Extinct (1970) (IUCN2.1)

Scientific classification
- Kingdom: Animalia
- Phylum: Chordata
- Class: Mammalia
- Infraclass: Placentalia
- Order: Carnivora
- Family: Canidae
- Genus: Canis
- Species: C. rufus
- Subspecies: †C. r. rufus

Trinomial name
- †Canis rufus rufus (Audubon & Bachman, 1851)
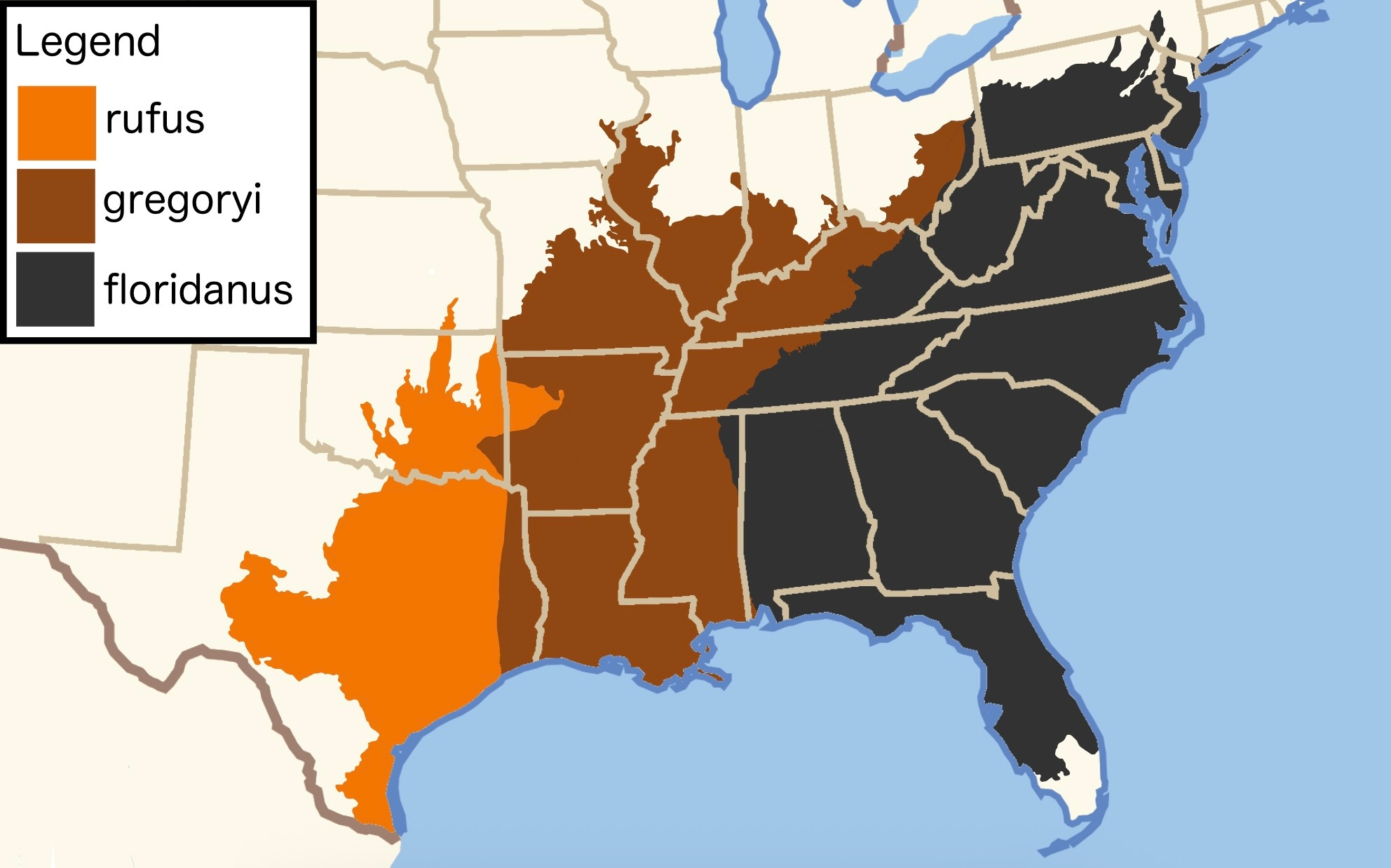
- Distribution of C. r. rufus (orange)

Synonyms
- Canis niger rufus; Canis lupus rufus

= Texas red wolf =

Extinct subspecies of red wolf

The Texas red wolf (Canis rufus rufus) is an extinct subspecies of red wolf native to Arkansas, Oklahoma, and Texas until its extinction in the 20th century.

== Taxonomy ==
This subspecies is one of three subspecies of red wolf. The Texas red wolf was described in 1851 by John Bachman and John James Audubon in their book "Viviparous Quadrupeds of North America", where it was described as a variety of grey wolf C. lupus var. rufus and given the vernacular name of "Red Texan Wolf".

Professor Howard McCarley has hypothesized that the Texas red wolf is the result of hybridization between a western red wolf population (presumably belonging to the Mississippi Valley red wolf subspecies) and the southeastern coyote which occurred before 1900.

== Description ==
The Texas red wolf was the smallest of the red wolves and had a body length of 120 to 145 cm (47 to 57 in). These wolves' weight ranged from 30 to 60 lbs, though one individual from Llano, Texas weighed 28.5 kg (63 lbs). Unlike the other two subspecies, the Texas red wolf was more similar to the coyote rather than the eastern wolf in size and general proportions.

== Behaviour and ecology ==
=== Pathology ===
A 1948 study about ectoparasites harming coyotes and Texas red wolves showed that the most common ectoparasites out of 8 Texas red wolves from Texas were Amblyomma americanum (119 impacting 4 specimens from Marlin and Tennessee Colony), Pulex irritans (45 impacting 3 specimens from Marlin and Victoria), and Dermacentor variabilis (7 impacting 3 specimens from Vernon and Woodsboro). Other parasites found in Texas red wolves were Echidnophaga gallinacea (14 in 2 Woodboro specimens), Ctenocephalides felis (5 found in 2 Marlin specimens), and Heterodoxus spiniger (100 found in the same Marlin specimens).
