= Peggy Notebaert Nature Museum =

Natural history museum in Chicago, US

The Chicago Academy of Sciences Peggy Notebaert Nature Museum
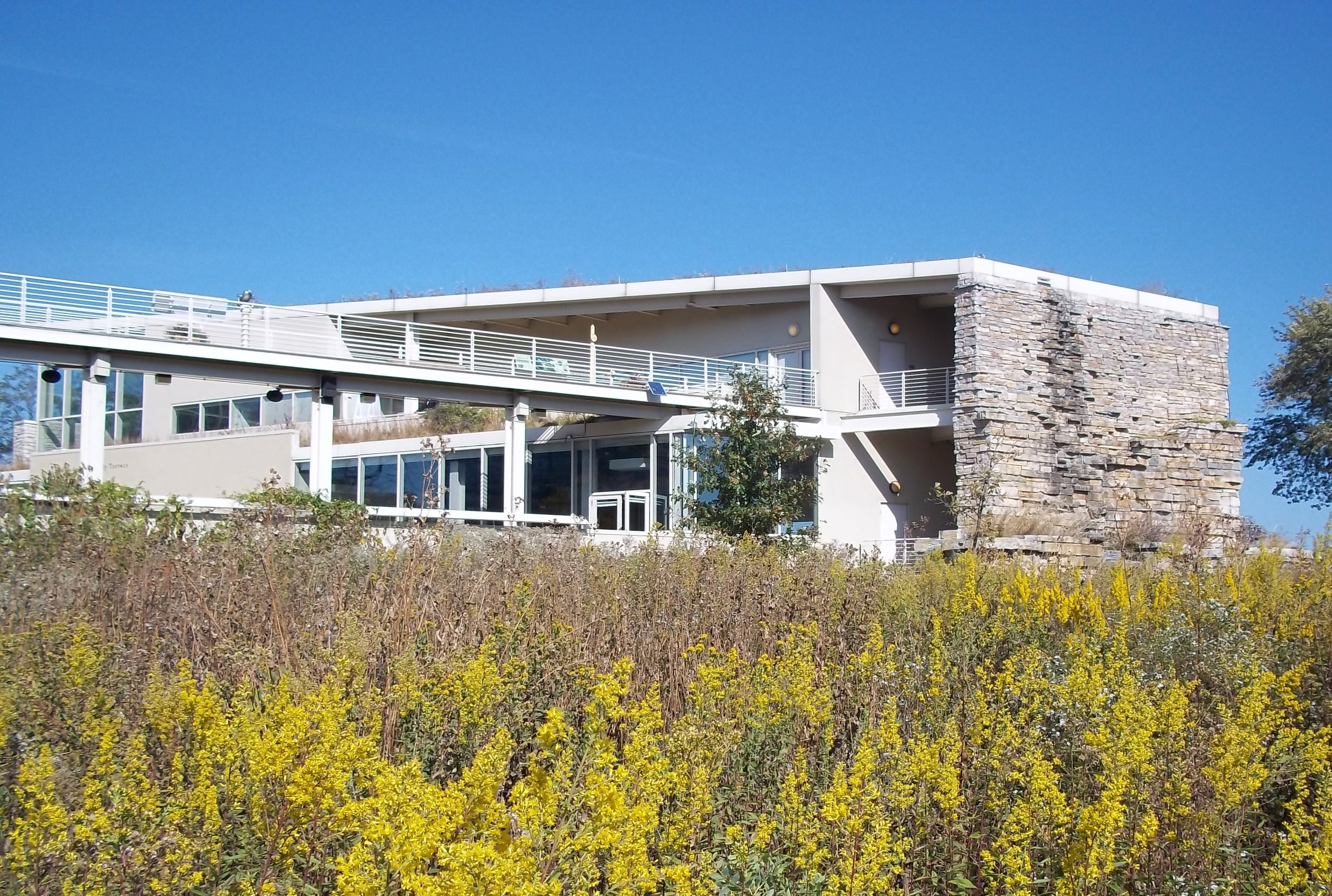
- The Nature Museum as seen from the southwest
- Established: 1857
- Location: 2430 N Cannon Drive, Chicago, IL 60614
- Coordinates: 41.9267°N 87.6352°W
- Type: Natural history museum
- Website: naturemuseum.org

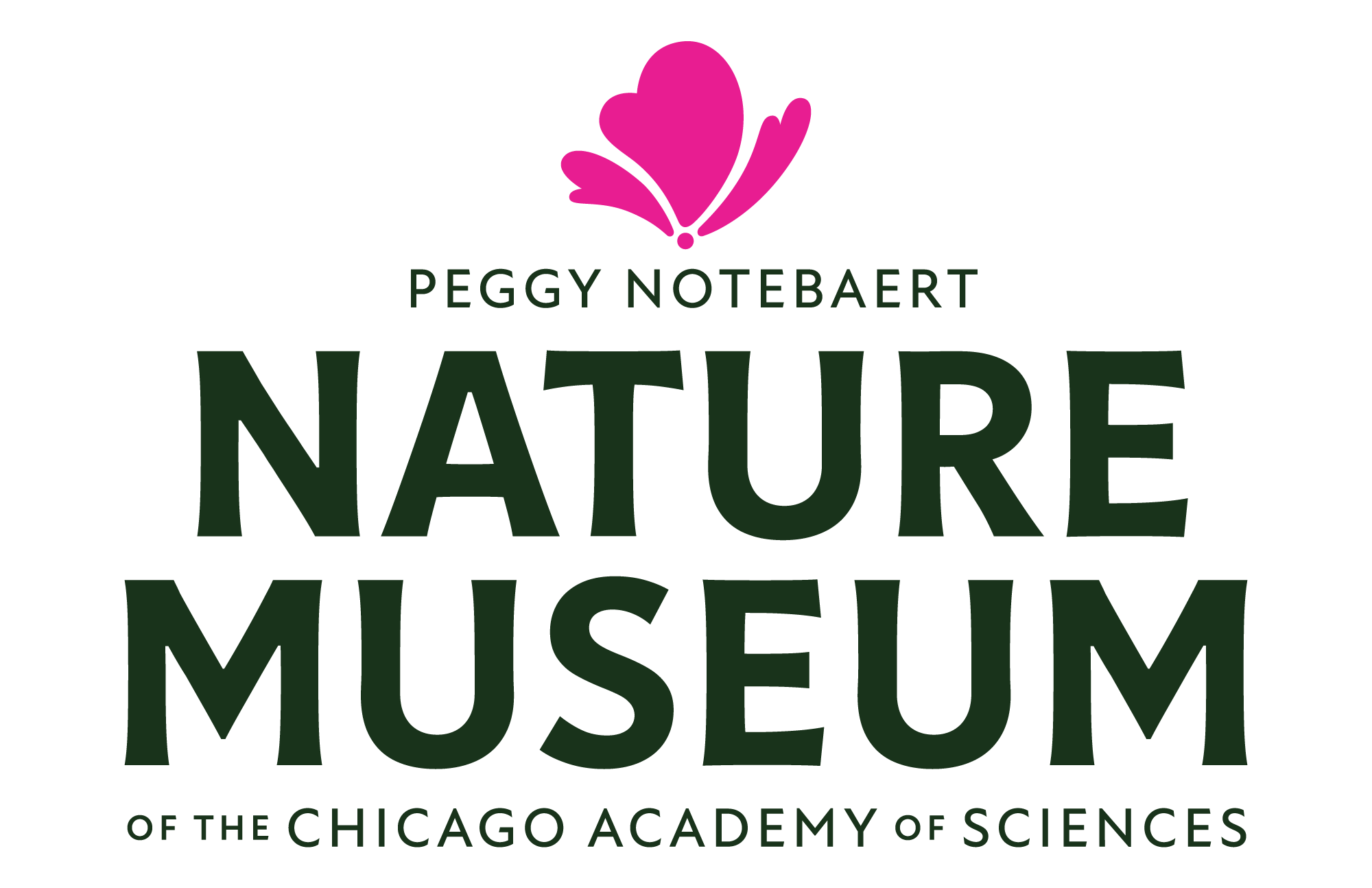
Official logo of the Peggy Notebaert Nature Museum of the Chicago Academy of Sciences

The Peggy Notebaert Nature Museum is a natural history museum mostly dedicated to children, located in Chicago, Illinois, United States, and operated by the Chicago Academy of Sciences. The museum traces its history to the founding collection of the academy in 1857. After a century at a nearby location, where it was the first of what eventually became eleven Chicago museum-in-the-parks, the academy built and opened its present museum named for benefactor Peggy Notebaert in 1999 at the intersection of Fullerton Parkway and Cannon Drive in Lincoln Park. The institution focuses on the natural history of the Chicago region, and offers educational programs for children and adults. It is also known for its live butterfly house, which is attached to a laboratory and program to study and enhance native Chicago area butterfly populations.

== History ==
The Chicago Academy of Sciences had previously been located at Lincoln Park's century-old Matthew Laflin Memorial Building. The academy was founded in 1857 by young prominent American naturalists, such as Robert Kennicott and William Stimpson. It was Chicago's first museum dedicated to nature and science, and developed one of the finest natural history collections in the United States in the mid-19th century, but that collection was lost in the Great Chicago Fire of 1871. The museum was rebuilt but lost its home again in the financial turmoil of the 1880s.

The academy then built a museum building in Lincoln Park in 1898, which became the model for the Chicago Park District's museum-in-the-parks program. The old museum attracted many visitors with its naturalistic dioramas of area ecological settings. After outgrowing the Laflin Building, a new home for the academy was constructed nearby, on the southeastern banks of the North Pond. Its old building is currently used for Lincoln Park Zoo administration. The new building, named the Peggy Notabaert Nature Museum, was completed in 1999.

== Exhibits and programs ==
The original series of long-term exhibitions and botanic recreations around the Notebaert building – including Butterfly Haven, City Science house, Water Lab and Wilderness Walk habitat exhibits – were developed by a team of academy staff, led by Paul G. Heltne, Kevin Coffee, and Douglas Taron, and designed by Lee H. Skolnick Design + Architecture Partnership with Carol Naughton Associates

The academy museum's exhibits today include displays about the ecological history of the Illinois region, a live butterfly house, and a green home demonstration. The butterfly house features more than 200 species of native and exotic butterflies. One of the academy's ongoing scientific efforts is the study, care, and breeding of native butterflies for species population support in the Chicago area. The academy also offers more than 100 educational programs in the natural sciences for adults and children.

== Name ==
The academy museum's building is named in honor of benefactor Peggy Notebaert, wife of then Qwest Communications chairman and chief executive officer Richard Notebaert. The building was designed by Perkins and Will.

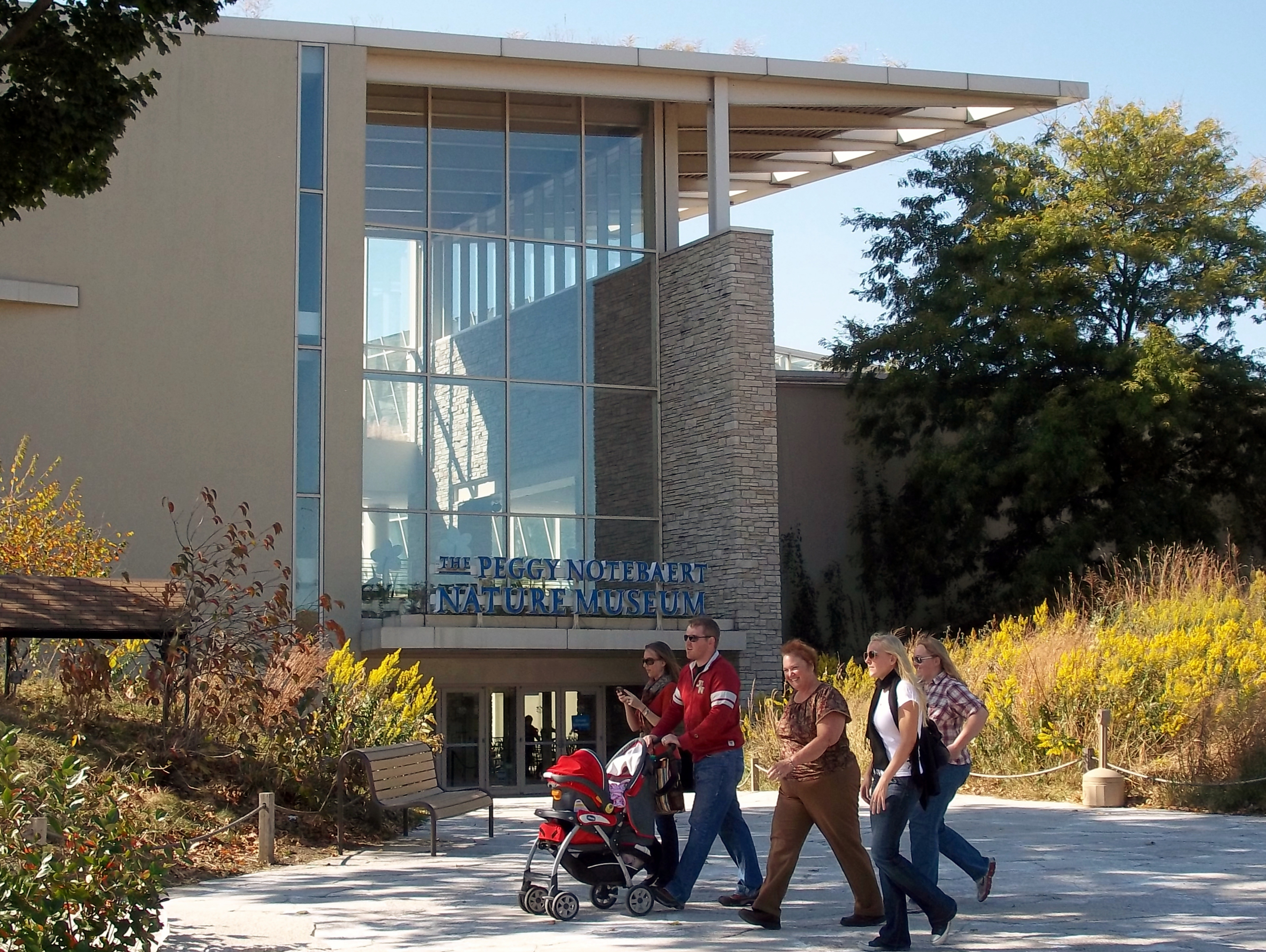
Front entrance on Cannon Drive

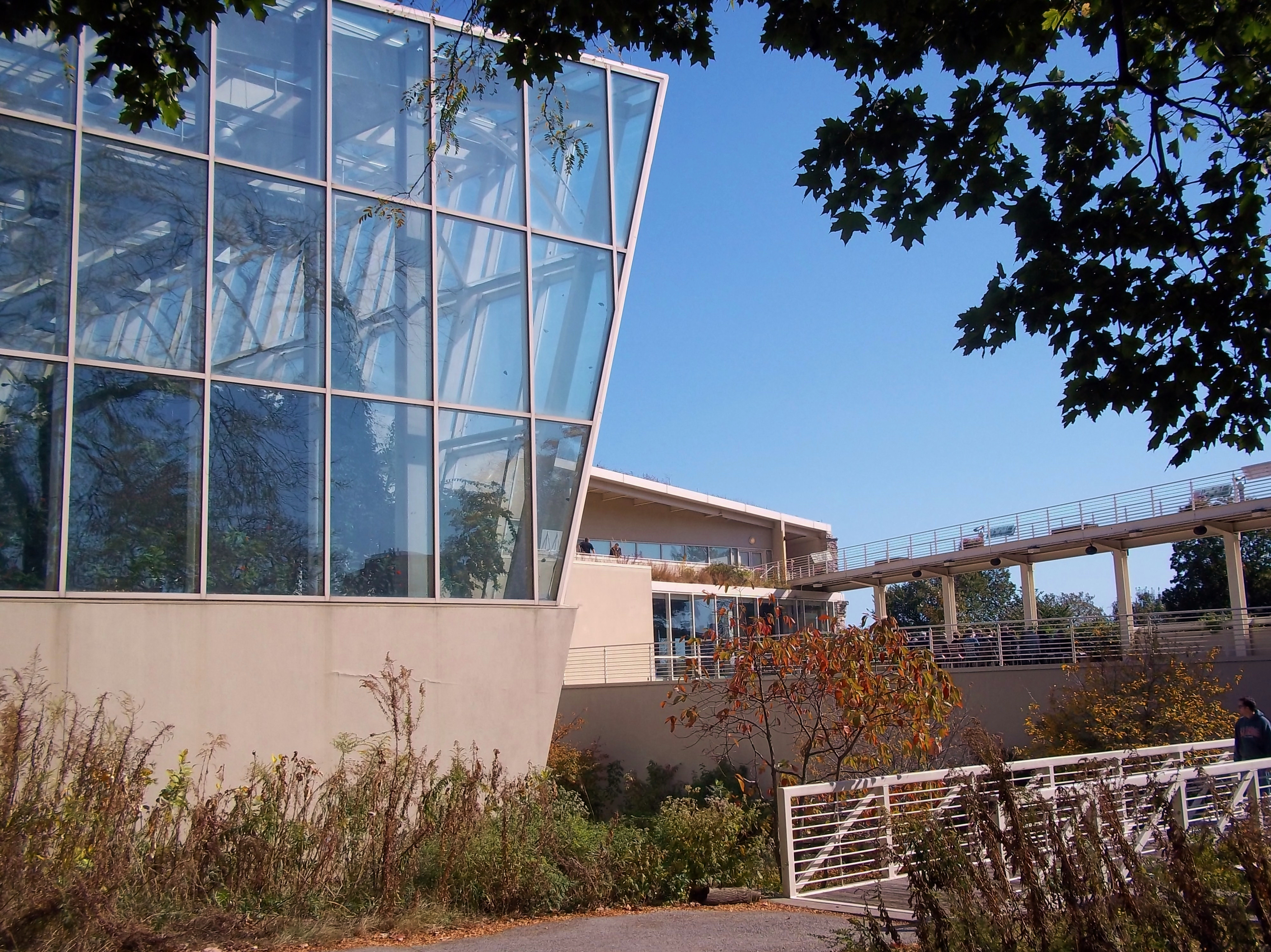
Butterfly house (left)

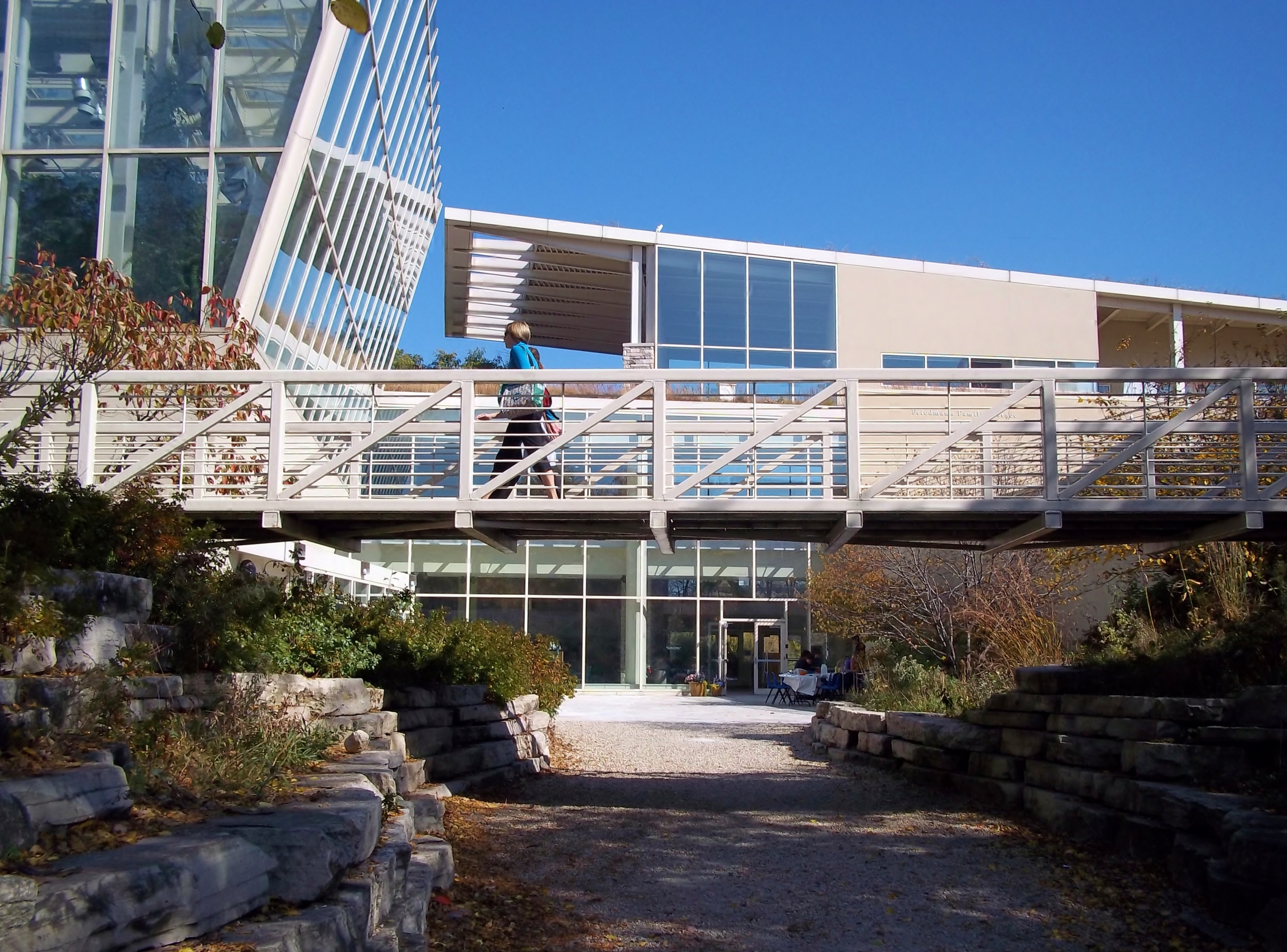
Landscape near North Pond

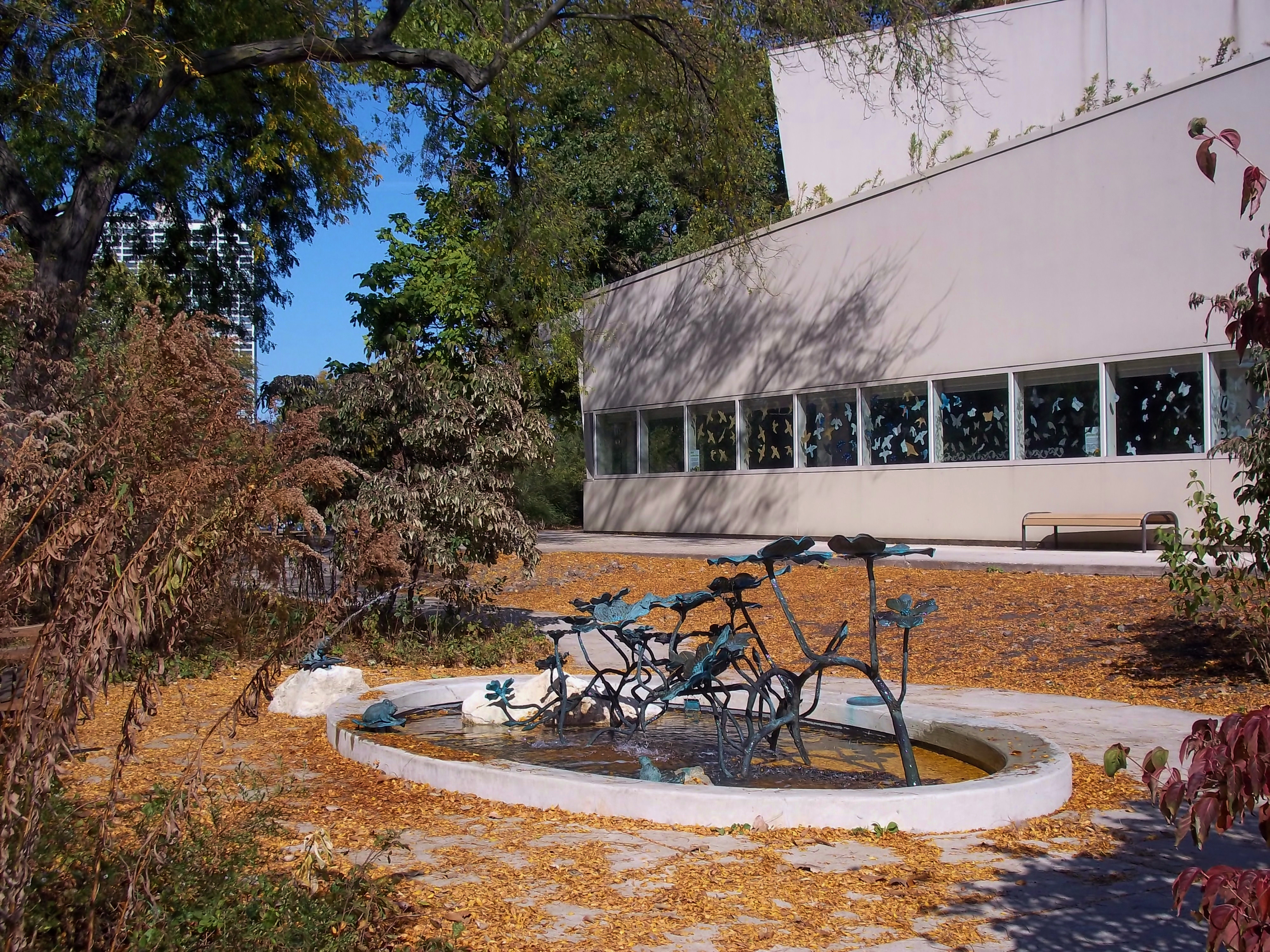
Garden fountain

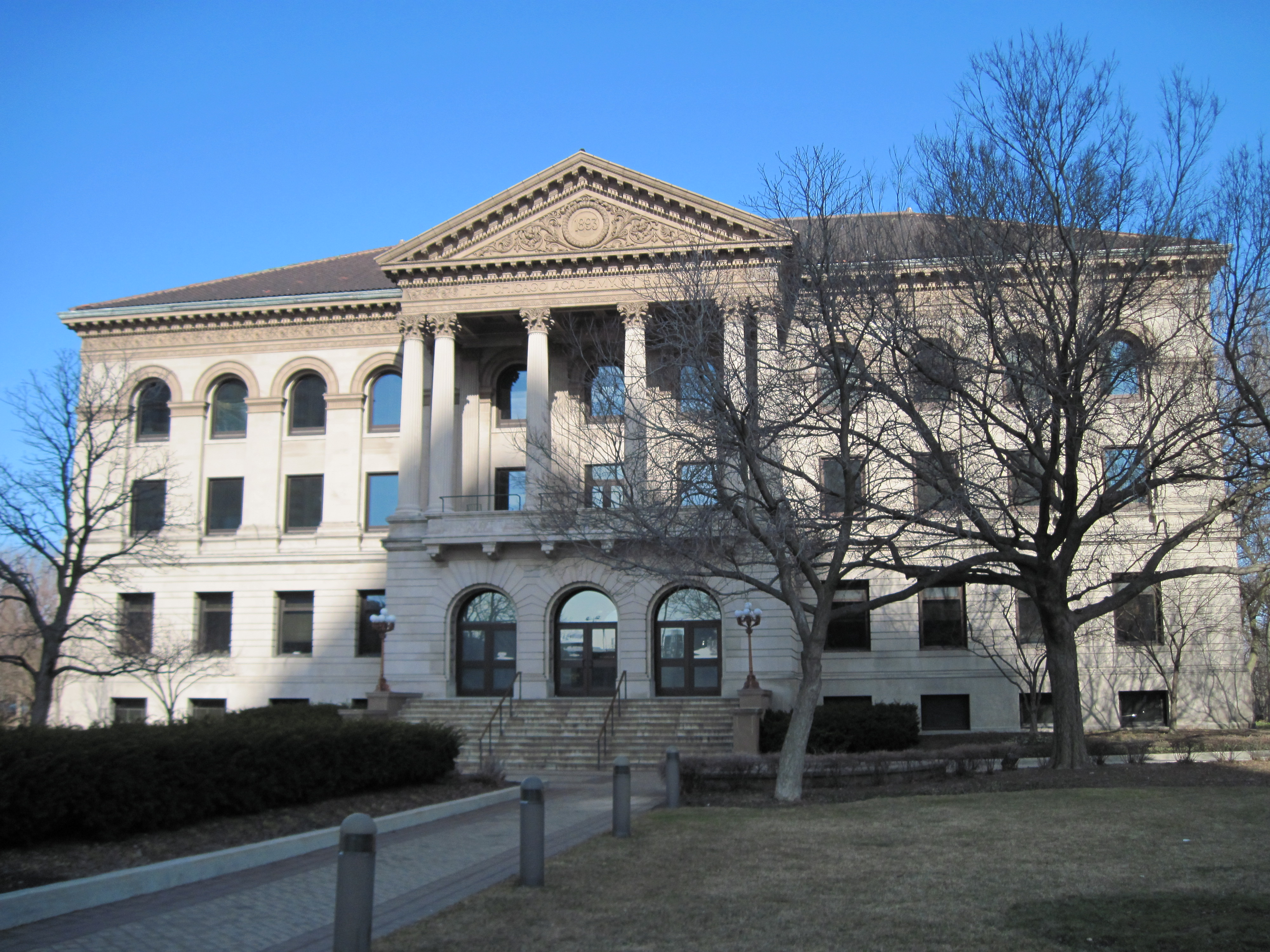
The former home of the Museum (1898–1995), now Lincoln Park Zoo administration

== See also ==
- List of museums and cultural institutions in Chicago
- Tappan Gregory –figure involved with the Chicago Academy of Sciences, whose mammal skin collection was posthumously donated to it
- Stephen S. Gregory Jr. –figure involved with the Chicago Academy of Sciences, whose ornithological specimen collection was posthumously donated to it
