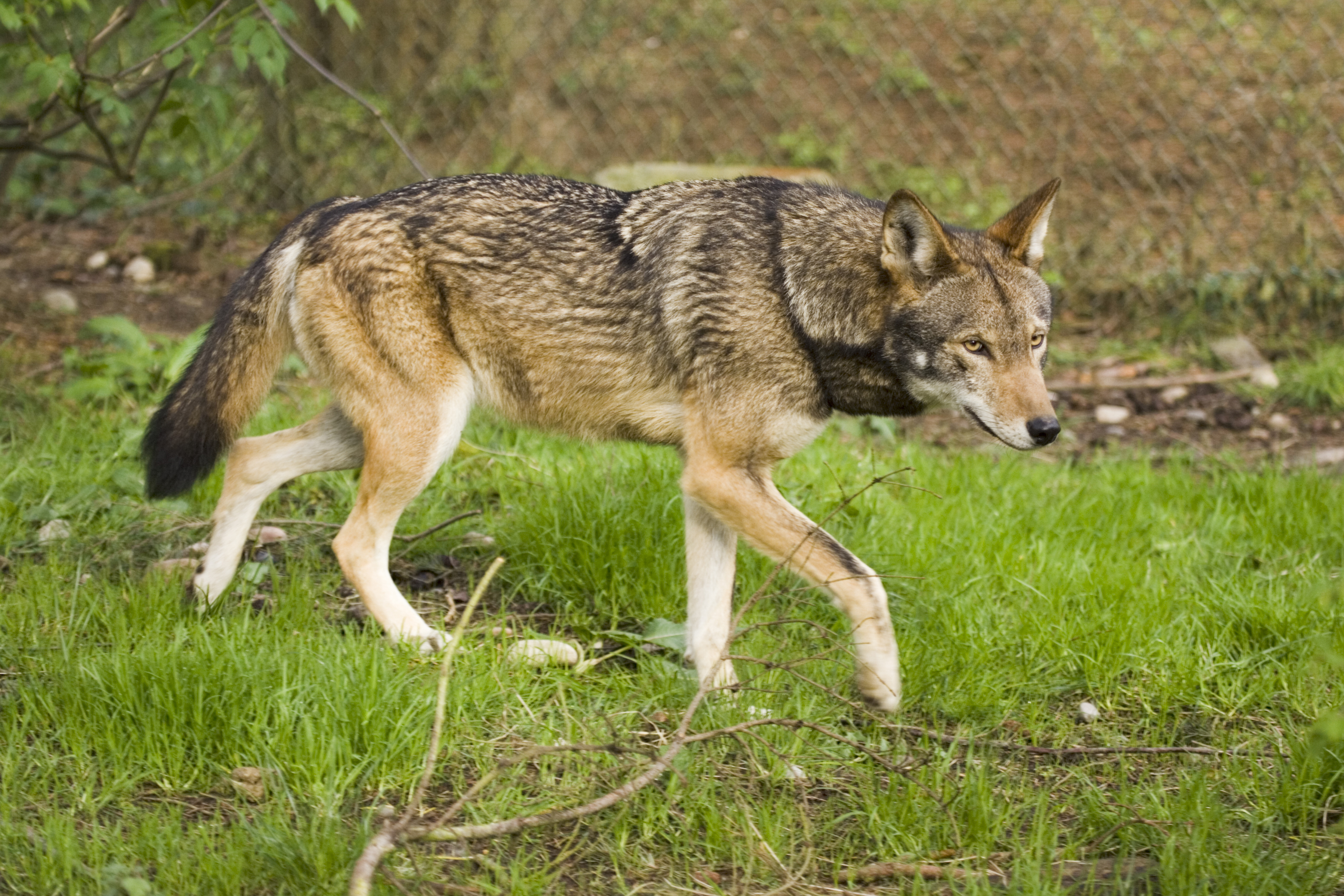

Conservation status
- Critically Endangered (IUCN 3.1)

Scientific classification
- Kingdom: Animalia
- Phylum: Chordata
- Class: Mammalia
- Order: Carnivora
- Family: Canidae
- Genus: Canis
- Species: C. rufus
- Subspecies: C. r. gregoryi

Trinomial name
- Canis rufus gregoryi Goldman, 1937

Synonyms
- Canis lupus gregoryi; Canis niger gregoryi

= Gregory's wolf =

Subspecies of carnivore

Gregory's wolf (Canis rufus gregoryi), also known as the Mississippi Valley wolf, is the sole living subspecies of the red wolf. It once roamed the regions in and around the lower Mississippi River basin. It is the subspecies of red wolf which inhabits North Carolina.

== Taxonomy ==
This wolf was recognized as a subspecies of Canis lupus in the taxonomic authority Mammal Species of the World (2005). This canid is proposed by some authors as a subspecies of the red wolf (Canis rufus or Canis lupus rufus). This wolf is named after photographer Tappan Gregory, who is the author of "The Black Wolf of the Tensas".

== Description ==
The subspecies was described as being larger than the Texas red wolf, but more slender and tawny. Its coloring includes a combination of black, grey, and white, along with a large amount of cinnamon coloring along the back of its body and the top of its head. It weighs around 27 to 32 kilograms (60 to 70 lb) on average.

== Range ==
Historically, Gregory's wolf ranged throughout the Mississippi River basin and extended northward toward Warsaw, Illinois and Wabash, Indiana. They were also found in western Kentucky and western Tennessee, and roamed the Ozark Mountain region throughout southern Missouri and southeastern Oklahoma. They could be found in most of Arkansas, apart from the northwestern region. Gregory's wolves reached the lower terrains of Louisiana and extended westward towards eastern Texas.
