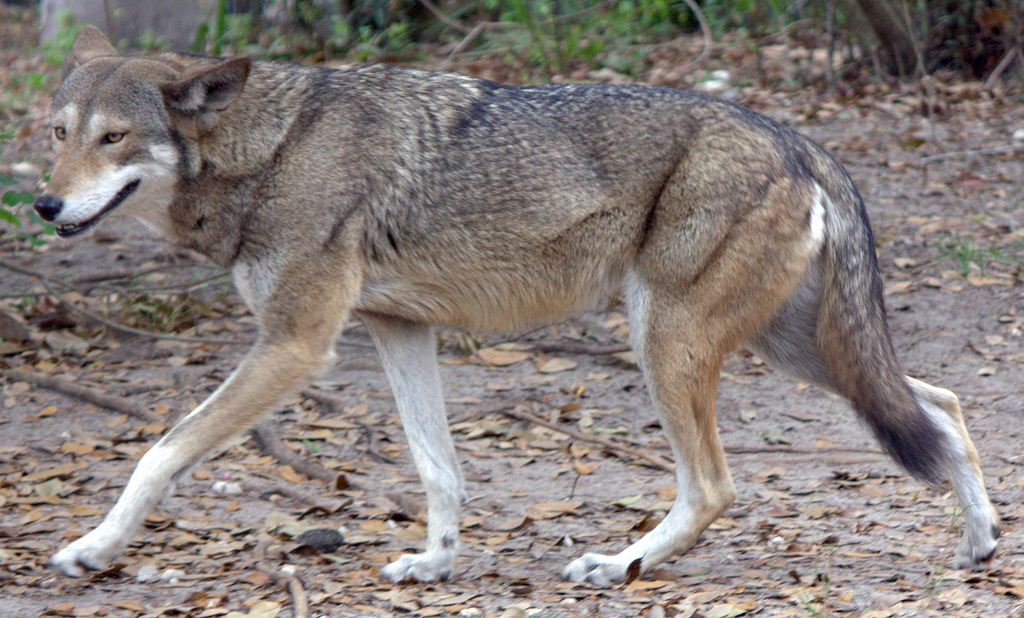
- A red wolf showing typical coloration

Conservation status
- Critically Endangered (IUCN 3.1)

- Endangered (ESA)

Scientific classification
- Kingdom: Animalia
- Phylum: Chordata
- Class: Mammalia
- Order: Carnivora
- Family: Canidae
- Genus: Canis
- Species: C. rufus

Binomial name
- Canis rufus Audubon & Bachman, 1851

Subspecies
- †C. r. floridanus; C. r. gregoryi; †C. r. rufus
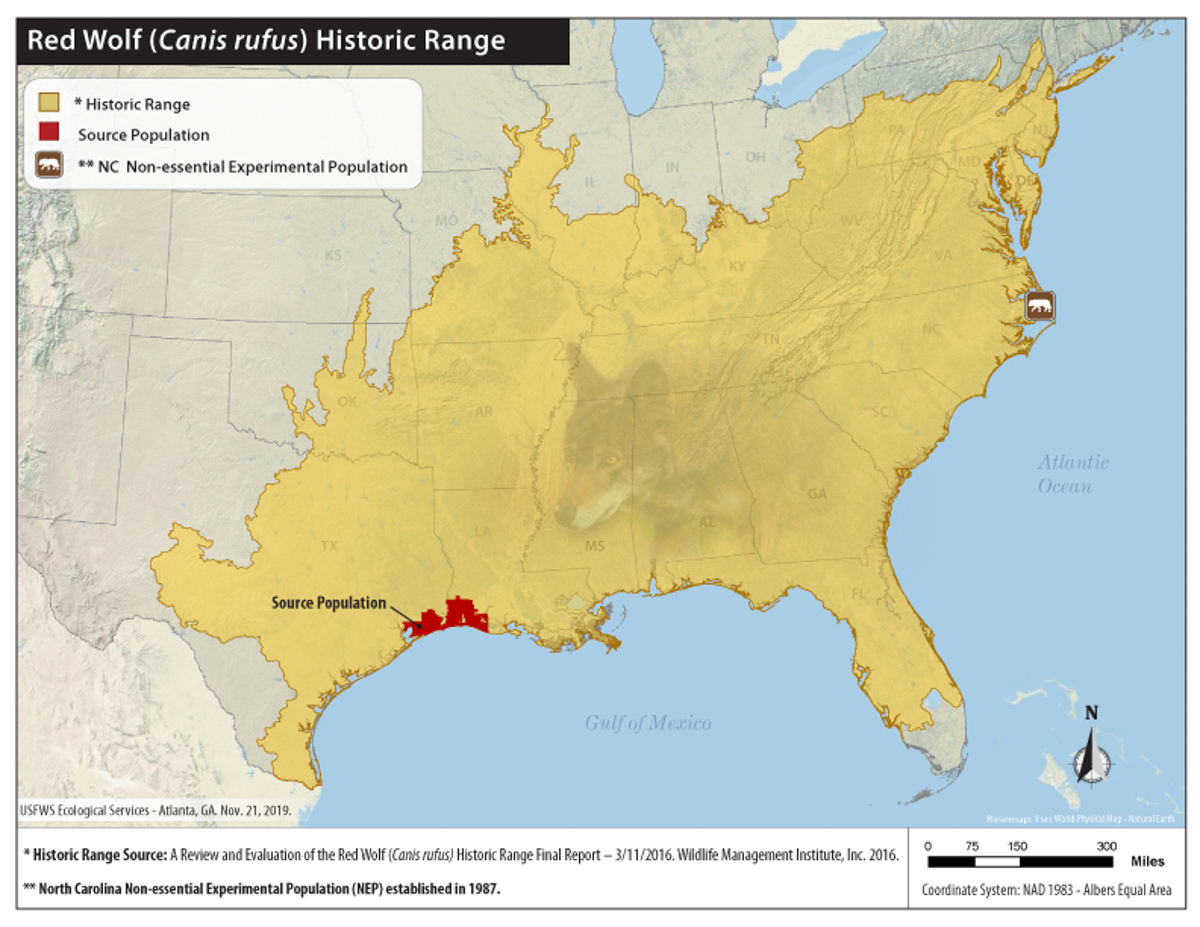
- Original range
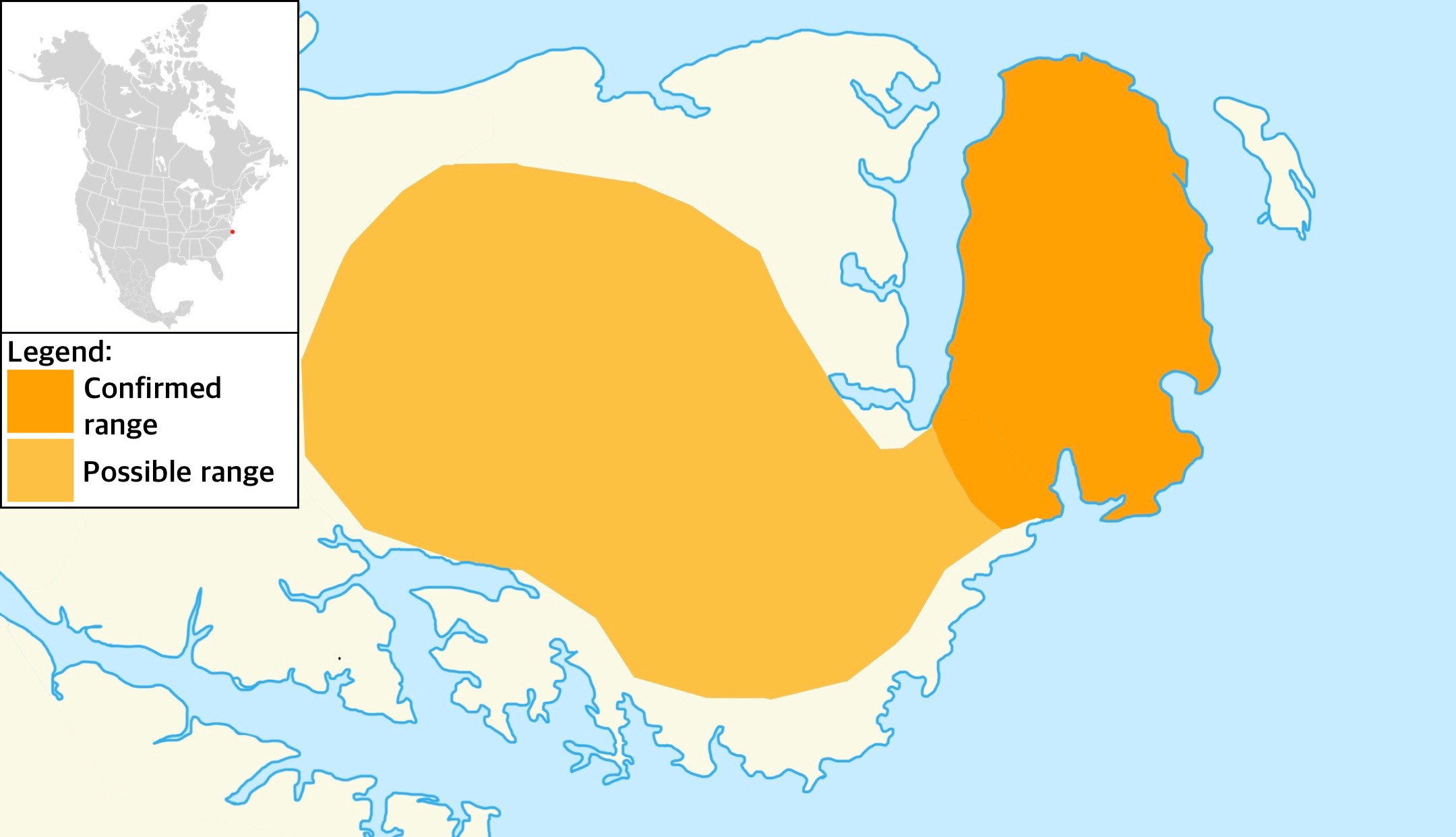
- The red wolf's distribution on the Albemarle-Pamlico Peninsula

= Red wolf =

Red wolf Temporal range: Holocene 10,000 years ago – present

Canid native to the southeastern United States

The red wolf (Canis rufus) is a canine native to the southeastern United States. Its size is intermediate between the coyote (Canis latrans) and gray wolf (Canis lupus).

The red wolf's taxonomic classification as a species has been contentious for nearly a century, being considered either a subspecies of the gray wolf or a coywolf (a genetic admixture of coyote and wolf). Although this has caused its exclusion from some conservation lists, in 1973 the U.S. Fish and Wildlife Service recognized it as endangered and in 1996 the International Union for Conservation of Nature listed it as critically endangered. As of August 2026, the wild red wolf population was estimated at approximately 22–23 adults and subadults, with an additional 14–15 pups. Around 295 red wolves were held in the captive conservation program.

== Description ==
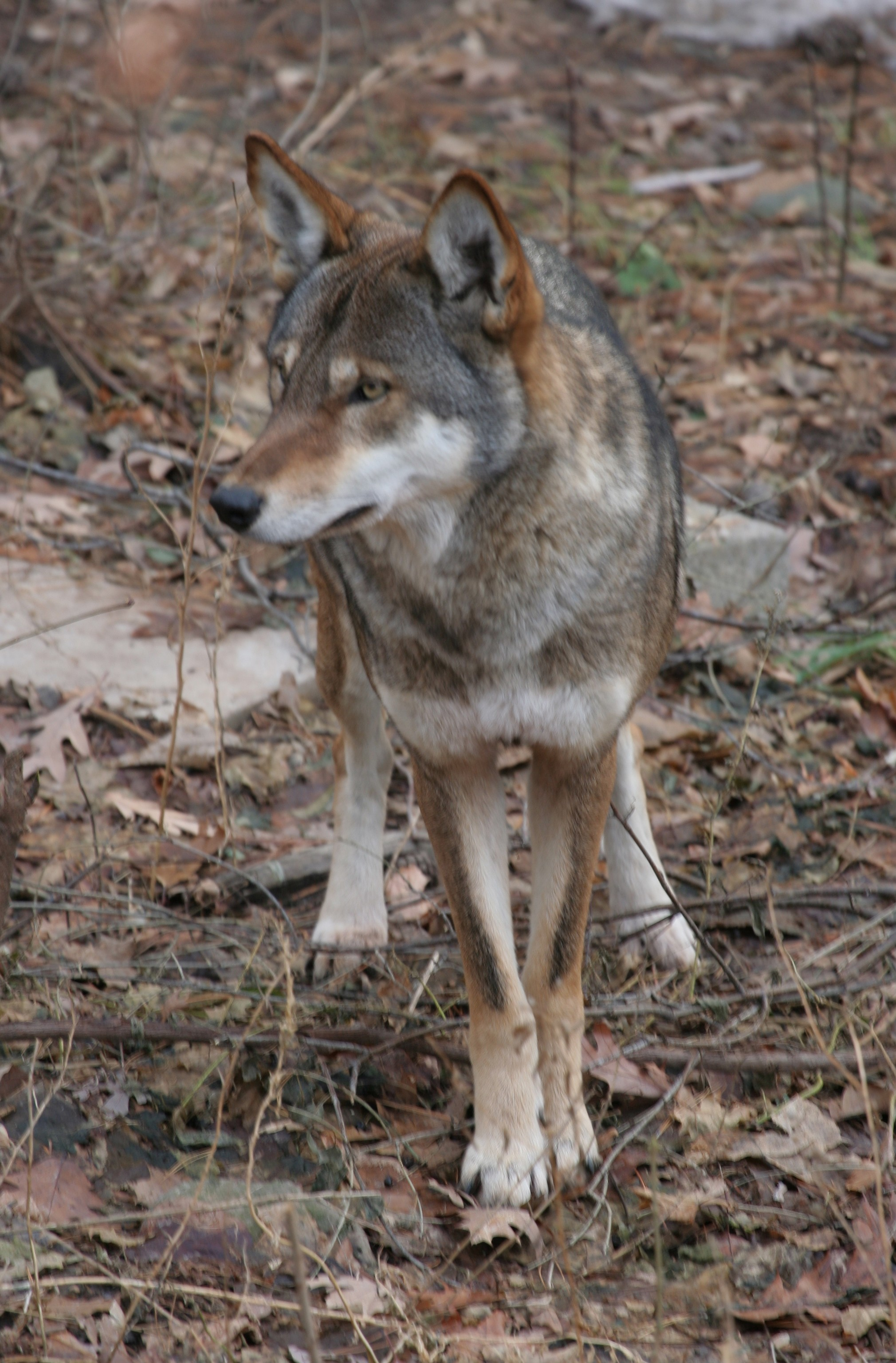
A red wolf

The red wolf's appearance is typical of the genus Canis. It is generally intermediate in size between the coyote and gray wolf, though some specimens may overlap in size with small gray wolves. A study of Canis morphometrics conducted in eastern North Carolina reported that red wolves are morphometrically distinct from coyotes and hybrids. Adults measure 136–165 centimetres (54–65 inches) in length, including the tail, which is about 37 cm (15 in) long. Their weight ranges from 20 to 39 kilograms (44 to 86 pounds), with males averaging 29 kg (64 lb) and females 25 kg (55 lb).

Its pelt is typically more reddish and sparsely furred than the coyote's and gray wolf's, though melanistic individuals do occur. Its fur is generally tawny to grayish in color, with light markings around the lips and eyes. The red wolf has been compared by some authors to the greyhound in general form, owing to its relatively long and slender limbs. The ears are also proportionately larger than the coyote's and gray wolf's. The skull is typically narrow, with a long and slender rostrum, a small braincase and a well developed sagittal crest. Its cerebellum is unlike that of other Canis species, being closer in form to that of canids of the Vulpes and Urocyon genera, thus indicating that the red wolf is one of the more plesiomorphic members of its genus.

The red wolf is more sociable than the coyote, but less so than the gray wolf. It mates in January–February, with an average of 6–7 pups being born in March, April, and May. It is monogamous, with both parents participating in the rearing of young. Denning sites include hollow tree trunks, along stream banks and the abandoned earths of other animals. By the age of six weeks, the pups distance themselves from the den, and reach full size at the age of one year, becoming sexually mature two years later.

Using long-term data on red wolf individuals of known pedigree, it was found that inbreeding among first-degree relatives was rare. A likely mechanism for avoidance of inbreeding is independent dispersal trajectories from the natal pack. Many of the young wolves spend time alone or in small non-breeding packs composed of unrelated individuals. The union of two unrelated individuals in a new home range is the predominant pattern of breeding pair formation. Inbreeding is avoided because it results in progeny with reduced fitness (inbreeding depression) that is predominantly caused by the homozygous expression of recessive deleterious alleles.

== Taxonomy ==
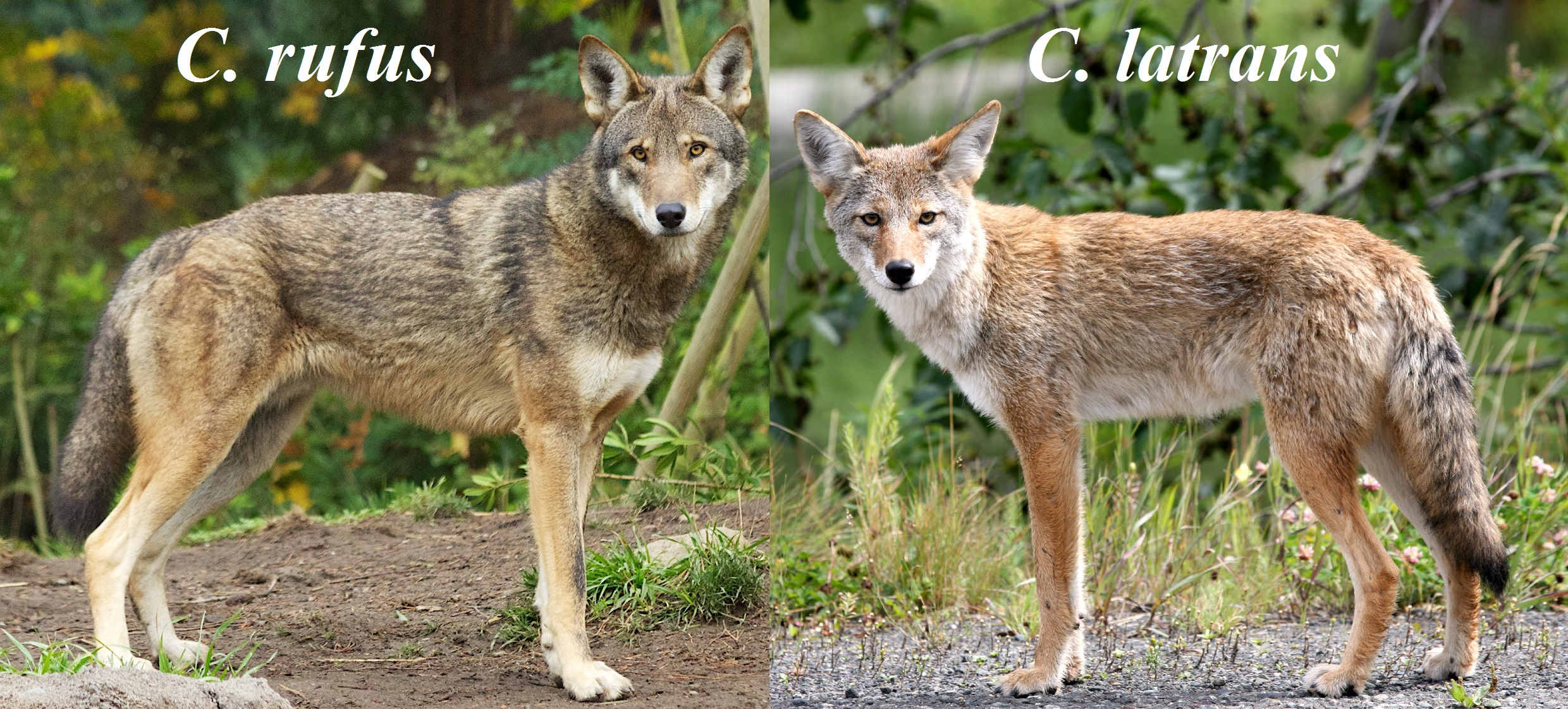
Comparative image of a red wolf and a western coyote (C. latrans incolatus)

The taxonomic status of the red wolf is debated. It has been described as either a species with a distinct lineage, a recent hybrid of the gray wolf and the coyote, an ancient hybrid of the gray wolf and the coyote which warrants species status, or a distinct species that has undergone recent hybridization with the coyote.

The naturalists John James Audubon and John Bachman were the first to suggest that the wolves of the southern United States were different from wolves in its other regions. In 1851, they recorded the "Black American Wolf" as C. l. var. ater that existed in Florida, South Carolina, North Carolina, Kentucky, southern Indiana, southern Missouri, Louisiana, and northern Texas. They also recorded the "Red Texan Wolf" as C. l. var. rufus that existed from northern Arkansas, through Texas, and into Mexico. In 1912, the zoologist Gerrit Smith Miller Jr. noted that the designation ater was unavailable and recorded these wolves as C. l. floridanus.

In 1937, the zoologist Edward Alphonso Goldman proposed a new species of wolf Canis rufus. Three subspecies of red wolf were originally recognized by Goldman, with two of these subspecies now being extinct. The Florida black wolf (Canis rufus floridanus) (Maine to Florida) has been extinct since 1908 and the Texas red wolf (Canis rufus rufus) (south-central US) was declared extinct by 1970. By the 1970s, the Mississippi Valley red wolf (Canis rufus gregoryi) existed only in the coastal prairies and marshes of extreme southeastern Texas and southwestern Louisiana. These were removed from the wild to form a captive breeding program and reintroduced into eastern North Carolina in 1987.

In 1967, the zoologists Barbara Lawrence and William H. Bossert believed that the case for classifying C. rufus as a species was based too heavily on the small red wolves of central Texas, from where it was known that there existed hybridization with the coyote. They said that if an adequate number of specimens had been included from Florida, then the separation of C. rufus from C. lupus would have been unlikely. The taxonomic reference Catalogue of Life classifies the red wolf as a subspecies of Canis lupus.

In 2021, the American Society of Mammalogists considered the red wolf as its own species (Canis rufus).

=== Taxonomic debate ===
When European settlers first arrived to North America, the coyote's range was limited to the western half of the continent. They existed in the arid areas and across the open plains, including the prairie regions of the midwestern states. Early explorers found some in Indiana and Wisconsin. From the mid-1800s onward, coyotes began expanding beyond their original range.

The taxonomic debate regarding North American wolves can be summarised as follows:

There are two prevailing evolutionary models for North American Canis:

(i) a two-species model
that identifies grey wolves (C. lupus) and (western) coyotes (Canis latrans) as distinct species that gave rise to various hybrids, including the Great Lakes-boreal wolf (also known as Great Lakes wolf), the eastern coyote (also known as Coywolf / brush wolf / tweed wolf), the red wolf, and the eastern (Algonquin) wolf;

and

(ii) a three-species model
that identifies the grey wolf, western coyote, and eastern wolf (C. lycaon) as distinct species, where Great Lakes-boreal wolves are the product of grey wolf × eastern wolf hybridization, eastern coyotes are the result of eastern wolf × western coyote hybridization, and red wolves are considered historically the same species as the eastern wolf, although their contemporary genetic signature has diverged owing to a bottleneck associated with captive breeding.

==== Fossil evidence ====
The paleontologist Ronald M. Nowak notes that the oldest fossil remains of the red wolf are 10,000 years old and were found in Florida near Melbourne, Brevard County, Withlacoochee River, Citrus County, and Devil's Den Cave, Levy County. He notes that there are only a few, but questionable, fossil remains of the gray wolf found in the southeastern states. He proposes that following the extinction of the dire wolf, the coyote appears to have been displaced from the southeastern US by the red wolf until the last century, when the extirpation of wolves allowed the coyote to expand its range. He also proposes that the ancestor of all North American and Eurasian wolves was C. mosbachensis, which lived in the Middle Pleistocene 700,000–300,000 years ago.

C. mosbachensis was a wolf that once lived across Eurasia before going extinct. It was smaller than most North American wolf populations and smaller than C. rufus, and has been described as being similar in size to the small Indian wolf, Canis lupus pallipes. He further proposes that C. mosbachensis invaded North America where it became isolated by the later glaciation and there gave rise to C. rufus. In Eurasia, C. mosbachensis evolved into C. lupus, which later invaded North America.

The paleontologist and expert on the genus Canis' natural history, Xiaoming Wang, looked at red wolf fossil material but could not state if it was, or was not, a separate species. He said that Nowak had put together more morphometric data on red wolves than anybody else, but Nowak's statistical analysis of the data revealed a red wolf that is difficult to deal with. Wang proposes that studies of ancient DNA taken from fossils might help settle the debate. In 2009, Tedford, Wang and Taylor reclassified the purported red wolf fossils as Canis armbrusteri and Canis edwardii.

==== Morphological evidence ====
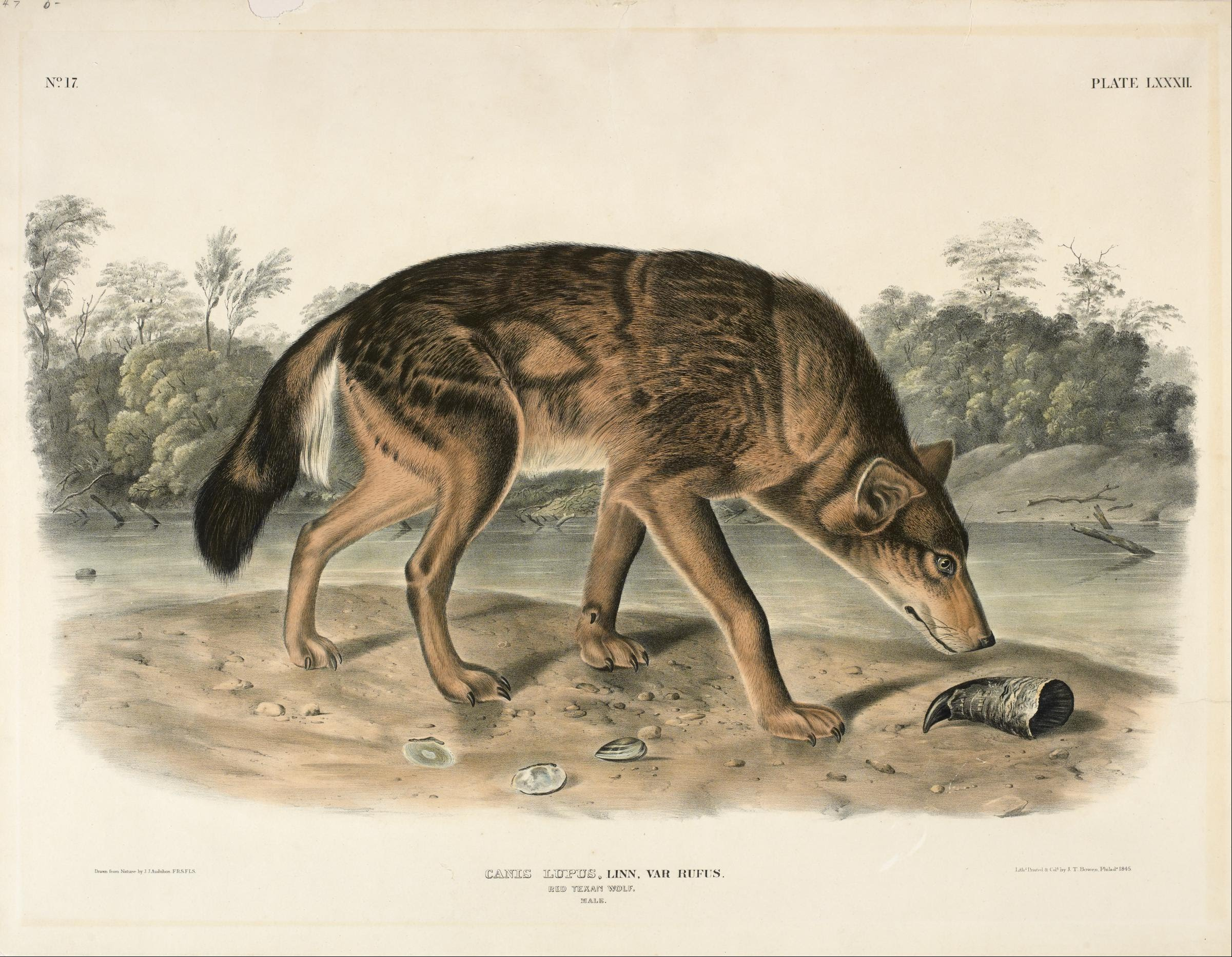
Audubon's depiction of the red wolf (1851)

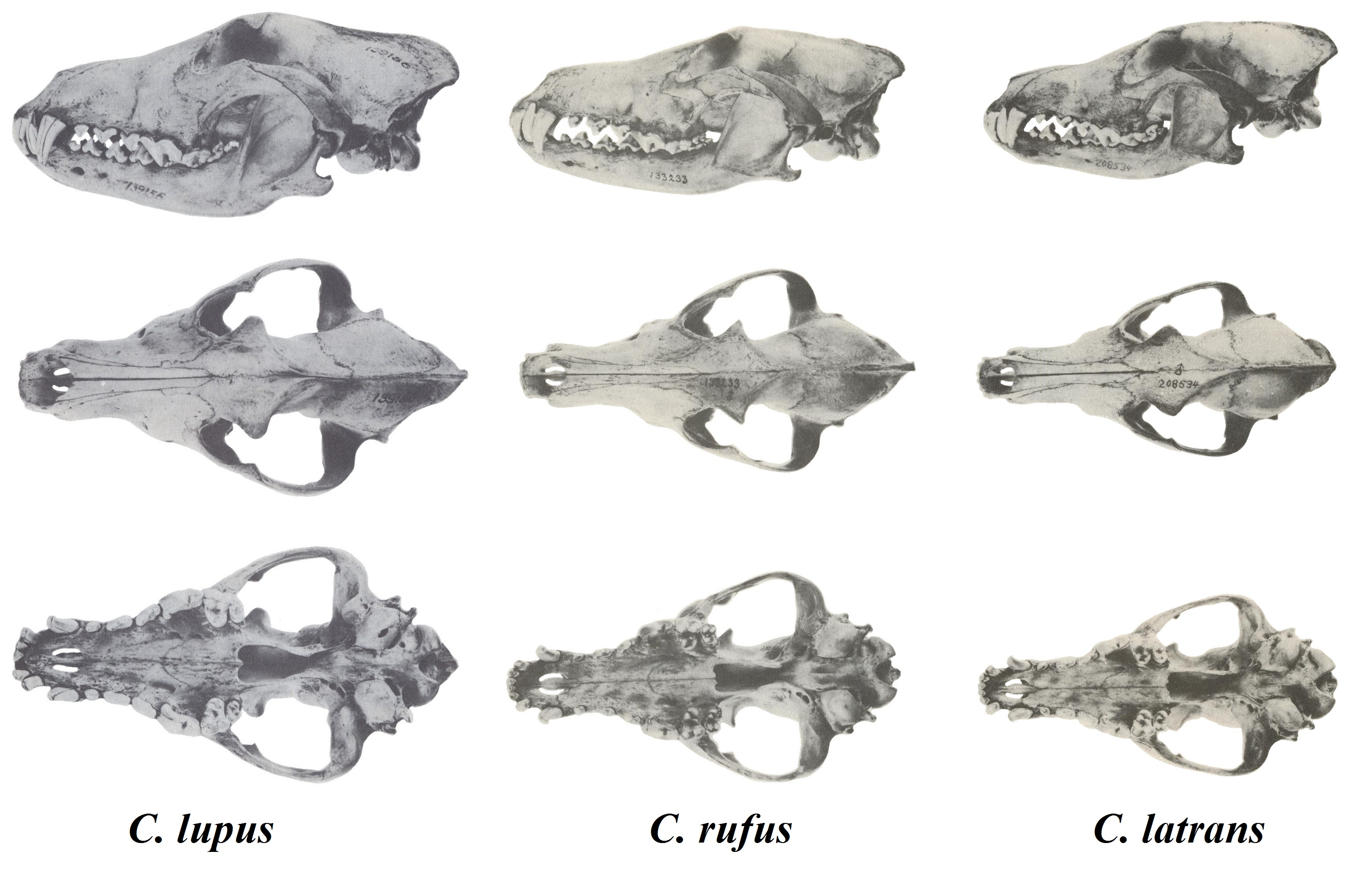
Skulls of North American canines, with the red wolf in the center

In 1771, the English naturalist Mark Catesby referred to Florida and the Carolinas when he wrote that "The Wolves in America are like those of Europe, in shape and colour, but are somewhat smaller." They were described as being more timid and less voracious. In 1791, the American naturalist William Bartram wrote in his book Travels about a wolf which he had encountered in Florida that was larger than a dog, but was black in contrast to the larger yellow-brown wolves of Pennsylvania and Canada. In 1851, the naturalists John James Audubon and John Bachman described the "Red Texan Wolf" in detail. They noted that it could be found in Florida and other southeastern states, but it differed from other North American wolves and named it Canis lupus rufus. It was described as being more fox-like than the gray wolf, but retaining the same "sneaking, cowardly, yet ferocious disposition".

In 1905, the mammalogist Vernon Bailey referred to the "Texan Red Wolf" with the first use of the name Canis rufus. In 1937, the zoologist Edward Goldman undertook a morphological study of southeastern wolf specimens. He noted that their skulls and dentition differed from those of gray wolves and closely approached those of coyotes. He identified the specimens as all belonging to the one species which he referred to as Canis rufus. Goldman then examined a large number of southeastern wolf specimens and identified three subspecies, noting that their colors ranged from black, gray, and cinnamon-buff.

It is difficult to distinguish the red wolf from a red wolf × coyote hybrid. During the 1960s, two studies of the skull morphology of wild Canis in the southeastern states found them to belong to the red wolf, the coyote, or many variations in between. The conclusion was that there has been recent massive hybridization with the coyote. In contrast, another 1960s study of Canis morphology concluded that the red wolf, eastern wolf, and domestic dog were closer to the gray wolf than the coyote, while still remaining clearly distinctive from each other. The study regarded these 3 canines as subspecies of the gray wolf. However, the study noted that "red wolf" specimens taken from the edge of their range which they shared with the coyote could not be attributed to any one species because the cranial variation was very wide. The study proposed further research to ascertain if hybridization had occurred.

In 1971, a study of the skulls of C. rufus, C. lupus and C. latrans indicated that C. rufus was distinguishable by being in size and shape midway between the gray wolf and the coyote. A re-examination of museum canine skulls collected from central Texas between 1915 and 1918 showed variations spanning from C. rufus through to C. latrans. The study proposes that by 1930 due to human habitat modification, the red wolf had disappeared from this region and had been replaced by a hybrid swarm. By 1969, this hybrid swarm was moving eastwards into eastern Texas and Louisiana.

In the late 19th century, sheep farmers in Kerr County, Texas, stated that the coyotes in the region were larger than normal coyotes, and they believed that they were a gray wolf and coyote cross. In 1970, the wolf mammalogist L. David Mech proposed that the red wolf was a hybrid of the gray wolf and coyote. However, a 1971 study compared the cerebellum within the brain of six Canis species and found that the cerebellum of the red wolf indicated a distinct species, was closest to that of the gray wolf, but in contrast indicated some characteristics that were more primitive than those found in any of the other Canis species. In 2014, a three-dimensional morphometrics study of Canis species accepted only six red wolf specimens for analysis from those on offer, due to the impact of hybridization on the others.

==== DNA studies ====
Different DNA studies may give conflicting results because of the specimens selected, the technology used, and the assumptions made by the researchers. (Note: Any one from a panel of genetic markers can be chosen for use in a study. The techniques used to extract, locate and compare genetic sequences can be applied using advances in technology, which allows researchers to observe longer lengths of base pairs that provide more data to give better phylogenetic resolution.)

Phylogenetic trees compiled using different genetic markers have given conflicting results on the relationship between the wolf, dog and coyote. One study based on SNPs (a single mutation), and another based on nuclear gene sequences (taken from the cell nucleus), showed dogs clustering with coyotes and separate from wolves. Another study based on SNPS showed wolves clustering with coyotes and separate from dogs. Other studies based on a number of markers show the more widely accepted result of wolves clustering with dogs separate from coyotes. These results demonstrate that caution is needed when interpreting the results provided by genetic markers.

===== Genetic marker evidence =====
In 1980, a study used gel electrophoresis to look at fragments of DNA taken from dogs, coyotes, and wolves from the red wolf's core range. The study found that a unique allele (expression of a gene) associated with Lactate dehydrogenase could be found in red wolves, but not dogs and coyotes. The study suggests that this allele survives in the red wolf. The study did not compare gray wolves for the existence of this allele.

Mitochondrial DNA (mDNA) passes along the maternal line and can date back thousands of years. In 1991, a study of red wolf mDNA indicates that red wolf genotypes match those known to belong to the gray wolf or the coyote. The study concluded that the red wolf is either a wolf × coyote hybrid or a species that has hybridized with the wolf and coyote across its entire range. The study proposed that the red wolf is a southeastern occurring subspecies of the gray wolf that has undergone hybridization due to an expanding coyote population; however, being unique and threatened that it should remain protected. This conclusion led to debate for the remainder of the decade.

Proposed phylogenetic tree of wolf evolution

- Ancestral Canid (1‑2 million years ago)
  - - Coyote
    - - Red wolf
      - Eastern wolf
  - Gray wolf

In 2000, a study looked at red wolves and eastern Canadian wolves. The study agreed that these two wolves readily hybridize with the coyote. The study used eight microsatellites (genetic markers taken from across the genome of a specimen). The phylogenetic tree produced from the genetic sequences showed red wolves and eastern Canadian wolves clustering together. These then clustered next closer with the coyote and away from the gray wolf. A further analysis using mDNA sequences indicated the presence of coyote in both of these two wolves, and that these two wolves had diverged from the coyote 150,000–300,000 years ago. No gray wolf sequences were detected in the samples. The study proposes that these findings are inconsistent with the two wolves being subspecies of the gray wolf, that red wolves and eastern Canadian wolves evolved in North America after having diverged from the coyote, and therefore they are more likely to hybridize with coyotes.

In 2009, a study of eastern Canadian wolves using microsatellites, mDNA, and the paternally-inherited yDNA markers found that the eastern Canadian wolf was a unique ecotype of the gray wolf that had undergone recent hybridization with other gray wolves and coyotes. It could find no evidence to support the findings of the earlier 2000 study regarding the eastern Canadian wolf. The study did not include the red wolf.

In 2011, a study compared the genetic sequences of 48,000 single nucleotide polymorphisms (mutations) taken from the genomes of canids from around the world. The comparison indicated that the red wolf was about 76% coyote and 24% gray wolf with hybridization having occurred 287–430 years ago. The eastern wolf was 58% gray wolf and 42% coyote with hybridization having occurred 546–963 years ago. The study rejected the theory of a common ancestry for the red and eastern wolves. However the next year, a study reviewed a subset of the 2011 study's Single-nucleotide polymorphism (SNP) data and proposed that its methodology had skewed the results and that the red and eastern wolves are not hybrids but are in fact the same species separate from the gray wolf. The 2012 study proposed that there are three true Canis species in North America: The gray wolf, the western coyote, and the red wolf / eastern wolf. The eastern wolf was represented by the Algonquin wolf. The Great Lakes wolf was found to be a hybrid of the eastern wolf and the gray wolf. Finally, the study found the eastern coyote itself to be yet another hybrid between the western coyote and the eastern (Algonquin) wolf.

Also in 2011, a scientific literature review was undertaken to help assess the taxonomy of North American wolves. One of the findings proposed was that the eastern wolf is supported as a separate species by morphological and genetic data. Genetic data supports a close relationship between the eastern and red wolves, but not close enough to support these as one species. It was "likely" that these were the separate descendants of a common ancestor shared with coyotes. This review was published in 2012. In 2014, the National Center for Ecological Analysis and Synthesis was invited by the US Fish and Wildlife Service to provide an independent review of its proposed rule relating to gray wolves. The center's panel findings were that the proposed rule depended heavily upon a single analysis contained in a scientific literature review by Chambers et al. (2011 ), that that study was not universally accepted, that the issue was "not settled", and that the rule does not represent the "best available science".

Brzeski et al. (2016) conducted an mDNA analysis of three ancient (300–1,900 years old) wolf-like samples from the southeastern United States found that they grouped with the coyote clade, although their teeth were wolf-like. The study proposed that the specimens were either coyotes and this would mean that coyotes had occupied this region continuously rather than intermittently, a North American evolved red wolf lineage related to coyotes, or an ancient coyote–wolf hybrid. Ancient hybridization between wolves and coyotes would likely have been due to natural events or early human activities, not landscape changes associated with European colonization because of the age of these samples. Coyote–wolf hybrids may have occupied the southeastern US for a long time, filling an important niche as a medium-large predator.

===== Whole-genome evidence =====
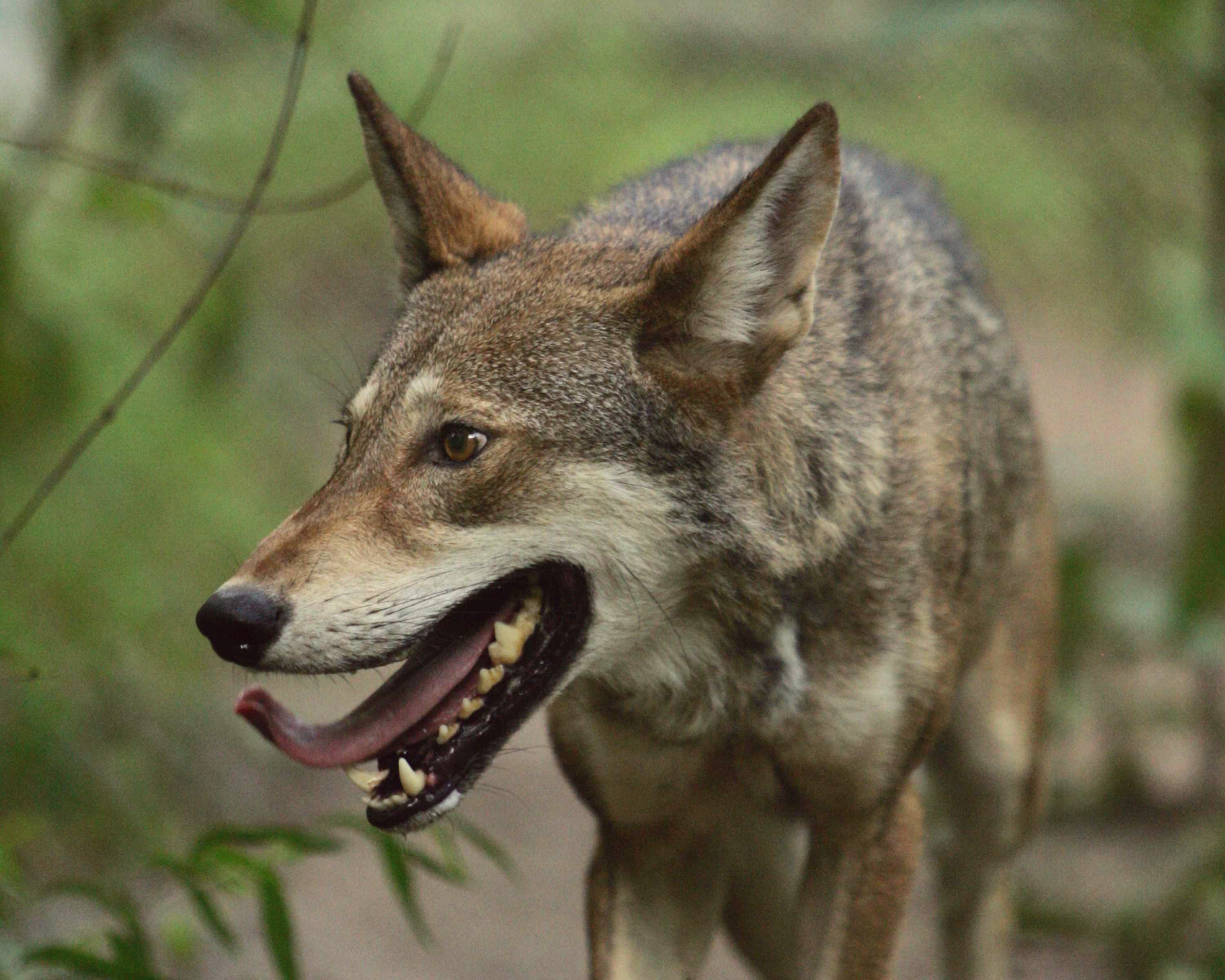
A red wolf in the forest

In July 2016, a whole-genome DNA study proposed, based on the assumptions made, that all of the North American wolves and coyotes diverged from a common ancestor less than 6,000–117,000 years ago. The study also indicated that all North American wolves have a significant amount of coyote ancestry and all coyotes some degree of wolf ancestry, and that the red wolf and Great Lakes region wolf are highly admixed with different proportions of gray wolf and coyote ancestry. One test indicated a wolf/coyote divergence time of 51,000 years before present that matched other studies indicating that the extant wolf came into being around this time. Another test indicated that the red wolf diverged from the coyote between 55,000 and 117,000 years before present and the Great Lakes region wolf 32,000 years before present. Other tests and modelling showed various divergence ranges and the conclusion was a range of less than 6,000 and 117,000 years before present. The study found that coyote ancestry was highest in red wolves from the southeast of the United States and lowest among the Great Lakes region wolves.

The theory proposed was that this pattern matched the south-to-north disappearance of the wolf due to European colonization and its resulting loss of habitat. Bounties led to the extirpation of wolves initially in the southeast, and as the wolf population declined wolf-coyote admixture increased. Later, this process occurred in the Great Lakes region with the influx of coyotes replacing wolves, followed by the expansion of coyotes and their hybrids across the wider region. The red wolf may possess some genomic elements that were unique to gray wolf and coyote lineages from the American South. The proposed timing of the wolf/coyote divergence conflicts with the finding of a coyote-like specimen in strata dated to 1 million years before present, and red wolf fossil specimens dating back 10,000 years ago. The study concluded by stating that because of the extirpation of gray wolves in the American Southeast, "the reintroduced population of red wolves in eastern North Carolina is doomed to genetic swamping by coyotes without the extensive management of hybrids, as is currently practiced by the USFWS."

In September 2016, the USFWS announced a program of changes to the red wolf recovery program and "will begin implementing a series of actions based on the best and latest scientific information". The service will secure the captive population which is regarded as not sustainable, determine new sites for additional experimental wild populations, revise the application of the existing experimental population rule in North Carolina, and complete a comprehensive Species Status Assessment.

In 2017, a group of canid researchers challenged the recent finding that the red wolf and the eastern wolf were the result of recent coyote-wolf hybridization. The group highlight that no testing had been undertaken to ascertain the time period that hybridization had occurred and that, by the previous study's own figures, the hybridization could not have occurred recently but supports a much more ancient hybridization. The group found deficiencies in the previous study's selection of specimens and the findings drawn from the different techniques used. Therefore, the group argues that both the red wolf and the eastern wolf remain genetically distinct North American taxa. This was rebutted by the authors of the earlier study. Another study in late 2018 of wild canids in southwestern Louisiana also supported the red wolf as a separate species, citing distinct red wolf DNA within hybrid canids.

In 2019, a literature review of the previous studies was undertaken by the National Academies of Sciences, Engineering, and Medicine. The position of the National Academies is that the historical red wolf forms a valid taxonomic species, the modern red wolf is distinct from wolves and coyotes, and modern red wolves trace some of their ancestry to historic red wolves. The species Canis rufus is supported for the modern red wolf, unless genomic evidence from historical red wolf specimens changes this assessment, due to a lack of continuity between the historic and the modern red wolves.

===== Wolf genome =====
Genetic studies relating to wolves or dogs have inferred phylogenetic relationships based on the only reference genome available, that of the Boxer dog. In 2017, the first reference genome of the wolf Canis lupus lupus was mapped to aid future research. In 2018, a study looked at the genomic structure and admixture of North American wolves, wolf-like canids, and coyotes using specimens from across their entire range that mapped the largest dataset of nuclear genome sequences against the wolf reference genome. The study supports the findings of previous studies that North American gray wolves and wolf-like canids were the result of complex gray wolf and coyote mixing. A polar wolf from Greenland and a coyote from Mexico represented the purest specimens. The coyotes from Alaska, California, Alabama, and Quebec show almost no wolf ancestry. Coyotes from Missouri, Illinois, and Florida exhibit 5–10% wolf ancestry. There was 40%:60% wolf to coyote ancestry in red wolves, 60%:40% in Eastern timber wolves, and 75%:25% in the Great Lakes wolves. There was 10% coyote ancestry in Mexican wolves and Atlantic Coast wolves, 5% in Pacific Coast and Yellowstone wolves, and less than 3% in Canadian archipelago wolves.

The study shows that the genomic ancestry of red, eastern timber and Great Lakes wolves were the result of admixture between modern gray wolves and modern coyotes. This was then followed by development into local populations. Individuals within each group showed consistent levels of coyote to wolf inheritance, indicating that this was the result of relatively ancient admixture. The eastern timber wolf (Algonquin Provincial Park) is genetically closely related to the Great Lakes wolf (Minnesota, Isle Royale National Park). If a third canid had been involved in the admixture of the North American wolf-like canids, then its genetic signature would have been found in coyotes and wolves, which it has not.

Gray wolves suffered a species-wide population bottleneck (reduction) approximately 25,000 YBP during the Last Glacial Maximum. This was followed by a single population of modern wolves expanding out of a Beringia refuge to repopulate the wolf's former range, replacing the remaining Late Pleistocene wolf populations across Eurasia and North America as they did so. This implies that if the coyote and red wolf were derived from this invasion, their histories date only tens of thousands and not hundreds of thousands of years ago, which is consistent with other studies.

The Endangered Species Act provides protection to endangered species, but does not provide protection for endangered admixed individuals, even if these serve as reservoirs for extinct genetic variation. Researchers on both sides of the red wolf debate argue that admixed canids warrant full protection under this Act.

===== Separate species that can be strengthened from hybrids =====
In 2020, a study conducted DNA sequencing of canines across southeastern US to detect those with any red wolf ancestry. The study found that red wolf ancestry exists in the coyote populations of southwestern Louisiana and southeastern Texas, but also newly detected in North Carolina. The red wolf ancestry of these populations possess unique red wolf alleles not found in the current captive red wolf population. The study proposes that the expanding coyotes admixed with red wolves to gain genetic material that was suited to the southeastern environment and would aid their adaptation to it, and that surviving red wolves admixed with coyotes because the red wolves were suffering from inbreeding.

In 2021, a study conducted DNA sequencing of canines across the remnant red wolf hybrid zone of southwestern Louisiana and southeastern Texas. The study found red wolf ancestry in the coyote genomes which increases up to 60% in a westward gradient. This was due to introgression from the remnant red wolf population over the past 100 years. The study proposes that coyotes expanded into the gulf region and admixed with red wolves prior to the red wolf going extinct in the wild due to loss of habitat and persecution. In the past two decades the hybrid region has expanded. The study presented the genetic evidence that the red wolf is a separate species, based on the structure of one of the loci of its X-chromosome which is accepted as a marker for distinct species. As such, the study suggested that the introgressed red wolf ancestry could be de-introgressed back as a basis for breeding further red wolves from the hybrids.

===== Pre-dates the coyote in North America =====
In 2021, a study of mitochondrial genomes sourced from specimens dated before the 20th century revealed that red wolves could be found across North America. With the arrival of the gray wolf between 80,000 and 60,000 years ago, the red wolf's range shrank to the eastern forests and California, and the coyote replaced the red wolf mid-continent between 60,000 and 30,000 years ago. The coyote expanded into California at the beginning of the Holocene era 12,000–10,000 years ago and admixed with the red wolf, phenotypically replacing them. The study proposes that the red wolf may pre-date the coyote in North America.

== Range and habitat ==
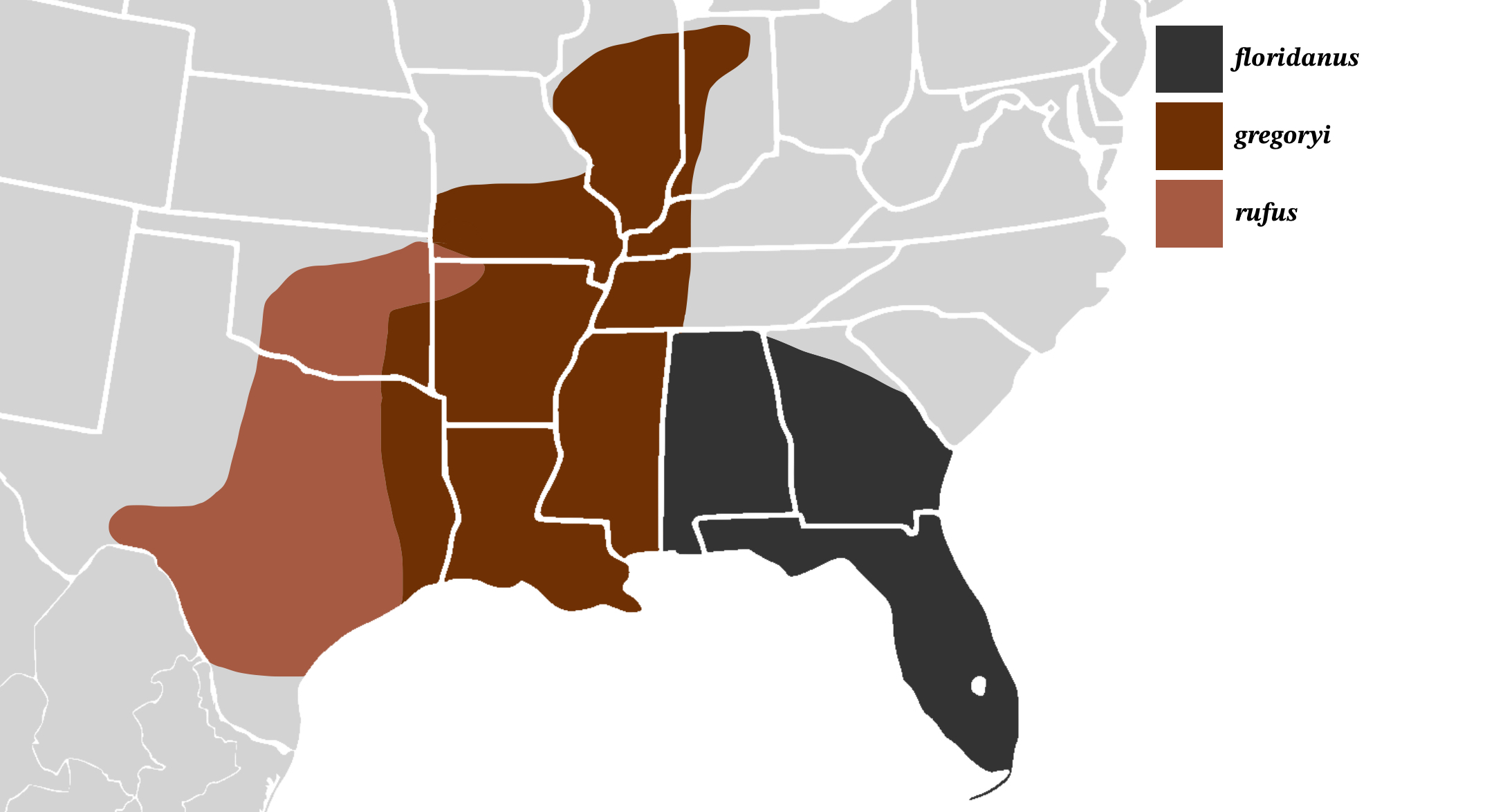
Modern distribution of C. rufus subspecies

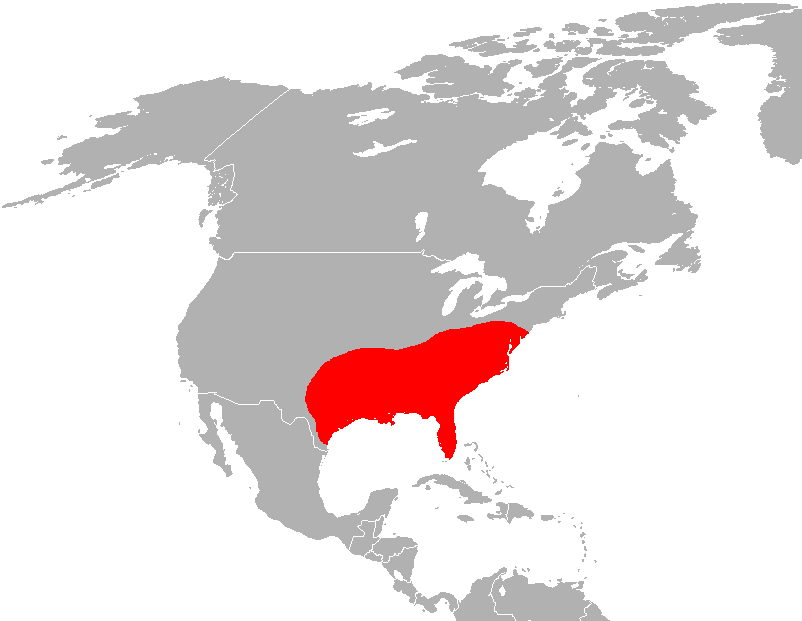
Historical range of C. rufus

The red wolf's range covers the southeastern US to the south Atlantic and Gulf coasts, extending as far north to the Ohio River Valley and central Pennsylvania, and as far west as southeastern Missouri and Central Texas. In 2002, Nowak published paleontological research expanding their historical range to land south of the Saint Lawrence River in Canada, along much of the East Coast, and west to Missouri and mid-Illinois, terminating in southern Central Texas.

Given their wide historical distribution, red wolves probably used a large suite of habitat types at one time. The last naturally occurring population used coastal prairie marshes, swamps, and agricultural fields used to grow rice and cotton. However, this environment probably does not typify preferred red wolf habitat. Some evidence shows the species was found in highest numbers in the once extensive bottom-land river forests and swamps of the southeastern US. Red wolves reintroduced into northeastern North Carolina have used habitat types ranging from agricultural lands to forest/wetland mosaics characterized by an overstory of pine and an understory of evergreen shrubs. This suggests that red wolves are habitat generalists and can thrive in most settings where prey populations are adequate and persecution by humans is slight.

== Ecology ==
Prior to its extinction in the wild, the red wolf's diet consisted of rabbits, rodents, and nutria (an introduced species). In contrast, the red wolves from the restored population rely on white-tailed deer, pig, raccoon, rice rats, muskrats, nutria, rabbits and carrion. White-tailed deer were largely absent from the last wild refuge of red wolves on the Gulf Coast between Texas and Louisiana (where specimens were trapped from the last wild population for captive breeding), which likely accounts for the discrepancy in their dietary habits listed here. Historical accounts of wolves in the southeast by early explorers such as William Hilton, who sailed along the Cape Fear River in what is now North Carolina in 1644, also note that they ate deer.

== Conservation ==
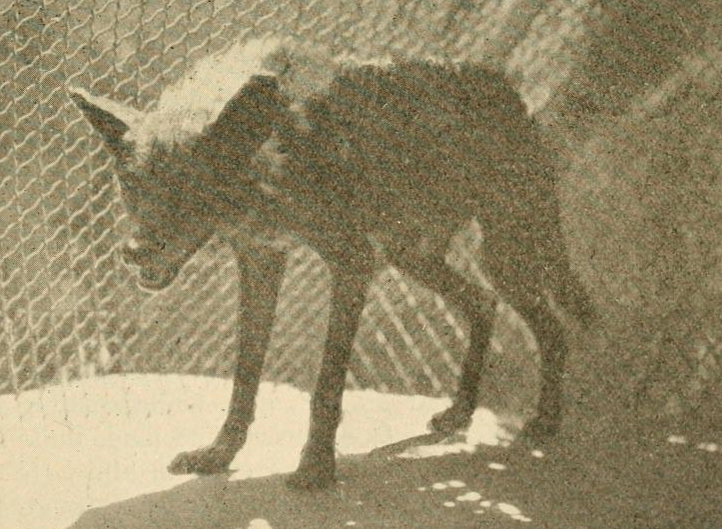
Melanistic red wolf at Audubon Park, New Orleans (1931)

The red wolf was nearly driven to extinction by the mid-1900s due to aggressive predator-control programs, habitat destruction, and extensive hybridization with coyotes. In 1940, the biologist Stanley P. Young noted that the red wolf was still common in eastern Texas, where more than 800 had been caught in 1939 because of their attacks on livestock. He did not believe that they could be exterminated because of their habit of living concealed in thickets. In 1962 a study of skull morphology of wild Canis in the states of Arkansas, Louisiana, Oklahoma, and Texas indicated that the red wolf existed in only a few populations due to hybridization with the coyote. The explanation was that either the red wolf could not adapt to changes to its environment due to human land-use along with its accompanying influx of competing coyotes from the west, or that the red wolf was being hybridized out of existence by the coyote.

By the late 1960s, it occurred in small numbers in the Gulf Coast of western Louisiana and eastern Texas. Fourteen of these survivors were selected to be the founders of a captive-bred population, which was established in the Point Defiance Zoo and Aquarium between 1974 and 1980. After a successful experimental relocation to Bulls Island off the coast of South Carolina in 1978, the red wolf was declared extinct in the wild in 1980 so that restoration efforts could proceed. In 1987, the captive animals were released into the Alligator River National Wildlife Refuge (ARNWR) on the Albemarle Peninsula in North Carolina, with a second unsuccessful release taking place two years later in the Great Smoky Mountains National Park. Of 63 red wolves released from 1987 to 1994, the population rose to as many as 100–120 individuals in 2012, but due to the lack of regulation enforcement by the US Fish and Wildlife Service, the population has declined to 40 individuals in 2018, about 14 in 2019 and 8 as of October 2021. No wild litters were born between 2019 and 2020.

Since 1987, red wolves have been released into northeastern North Carolina, where they roam 1.7 million acres. These lands span five counties (Dare, Hyde, Tyrrell, Washington, and Beaufort) and include three national wildlife refuges, a U.S. Air Force bombing range, and private land. The red wolf recovery program is unique for a large carnivore reintroduction in that more than half of the land used for reintroduction lies on private property. Approximately 680,000 acres (2,800 km^{2}) are federal and state lands, and 1,002,000 acres (4,050 km^{2}) are private lands.

Beginning in 1991, red wolves were also released into the Great Smoky Mountains National Park in eastern Tennessee. However, due to exposure to environmental disease (parvovirus), parasites, and competition (with coyotes as well as intraspecific aggression), the red wolf was unable to successfully establish a wild population in the park. Low prey density was also a problem, forcing the wolves to leave the park boundaries in pursuit of food in lower elevations. In 1998, the FWS took away the remaining red wolves in the Great Smoky Mountains National Park, relocating them to Alligator River National Wildlife Refuge in eastern North Carolina. Other red wolves have been released on the coastal islands in Florida, Mississippi, and South Carolina as part of the captive breeding management plan. St. Vincent Island in Florida is currently the only active island propagation site.

=== Captive breeding and reintroduction ===
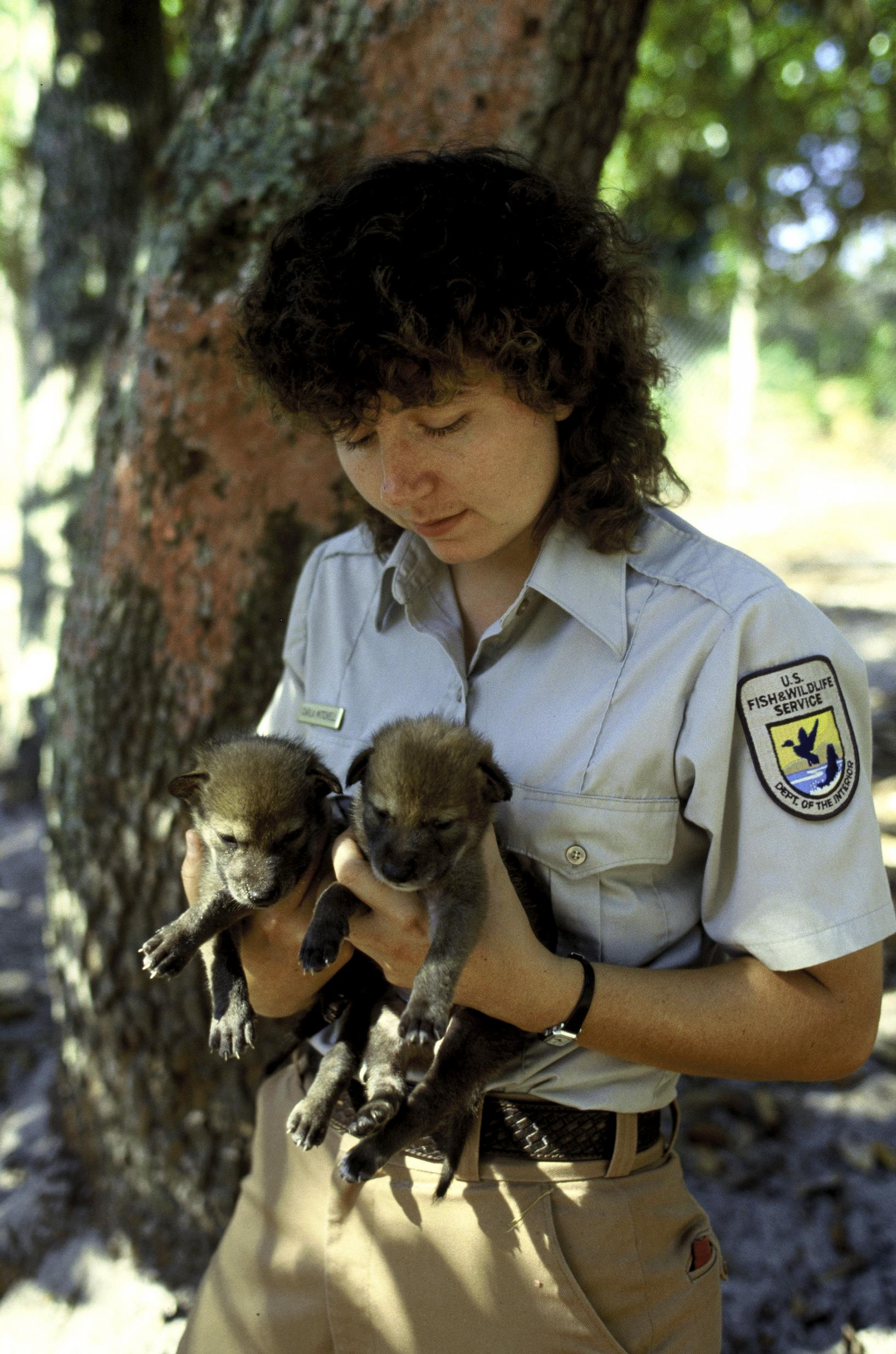
US Fish and Wildlife Service worker with red wolf pups, August 2002

After the 1973 passage of the Endangered Species Act, under which the US Fish and Wildlife Service (USFWS) recognizes the red wolf as an endangered species and grants it protected status, a captive-breeding program was established at the Point Defiance Zoological Gardens in Tacoma, Washington. From 1973 to 1980, the USFWS captured 400 animals from southwestern Louisiana and southeastern Texas.

Measurements, vocalization analyses, and skull X-rays were used to distinguish red wolves from coyotes and red wolf × coyote hybrids. Of the 400 canids captured, only 43 were believed to be red wolves and sent to the breeding facility. The first litters were produced in captivity in May 1977. Some of the pups were determined to be hybrids, and they and their parents were removed from the program. Of the original 43 animals, only 17 were considered pure red wolves and since three were unable to breed, 14 became the breeding stock for the captive-breeding program. These 14 were so closely related that they had the genetic effect of being only eight individuals.

In 1996, the red wolf was listed by the International Union for Conservation of Nature as a critically endangered species. It is sometimes excluded from endangered species lists due to its unclear taxonomic status. It is not listed in the CITES Appendices of endangered species.

=== 20th century releases ===
1976 release in Cape Romain National Wildlife Refuge
In December 1976, two wolves were released onto Cape Romain National Wildlife Refuge's Bulls Island in South Carolina with the intent of testing and honing reintroduction methods. They were not released with the intent of beginning a permanent population on the island. The first experimental translocation lasted for 11 days, during which a mated pair of red wolves was monitored day and night with remote telemetry. A second experimental translocation was tried in 1978 with a different mated pair, and they were allowed to remain on the island for close to nine months. After that, a larger project was executed in 1987 to reintroduce a permanent population of red wolves back to the wild in the Alligator River National Wildlife Refuge (ARNWR) on the eastern coast of North Carolina. Also in 1987, Bulls Island became the first island breeding site. Pups were raised on the island and relocated to North Carolina until 2005.

1986 release in Alligator River National Wildlife Refuge
In September 1987, four male-female pairs of red wolves were released in the Alligator River National Wildlife Refuge, in northeastern North Carolina, and designated as an experimental population. Since then, the experimental population has grown and the recovery area expanded to include four national wildlife refuges, a Department of Defense bombing range, state-owned lands, and private lands, encompassing about 1,700,000 acres (6,900 km^{2}).

1989 release on Horn Island, Mississippi
In 1989, the second island propagation project was initiated with release of a population on Horn Island off the Mississippi coast. This population was removed in 1998 because of a likelihood of encounters with humans. The third island propagation project introduced a population on St. Vincent Island, Florida, offshore between Cape San Blas and Apalachicola, Florida, in 1990, and in 1997, the fourth island propagation program introduced a population to Cape St. George Island, Florida, south of Apalachicola.

1991 release in the Great Smoky Mountains
In 1991, two pairs were reintroduced into the Great Smoky Mountains National Park, where the last known red wolf was killed in 1905. Despite some early success, the wolves were relocated to eastern North Carolina in 1998, ending the effort to reintroduce the species to the park.

=== 21st century status ===
Over 30 facilities participate in the red wolf Species Survival Plan and oversee the breeding and reintroduction of over 150 wolves.

In 2007, the USFWS estimated that 300 red wolves remained in the world, with 207 of those in captivity. By late 2020, the number of wild individuals had shrunk to only about 7 radio-collared and a dozen uncollared individuals, with no wild pups born since 2018. This decline has been linked to shooting and poisoning of wolves by landowners, and suspended conservation efforts by the USFWS.

A 2019 analysis by the Center for Biological Diversity of available habitat throughout the red wolf's former range found that over 20,000 square miles of public land across five sites had viable habitat for red wolves to be reintroduced to in the future. These sites were chosen based on prey levels, isolation from coyotes and human development, and connectivity with other sites. These sites include: the Apalachicola and Osceola National Forests along with the Okefenokee National Wildlife Refuge and nearby protected lands; numerous national parks and national forests in the Appalachian Mountains including the Monongahela, George Washington & Jefferson, Cherokee, Pisgah, Nantahala, Chattahoochee, and Talladega National Forests along with Shenandoah National Park and the lower elevations of Great Smoky Mountains National Park; Croatoan National Forest and Hofmann Forest on the North Carolina coast, and the Ozark, Ouatchita, and Mark Twain National Forests in the central United States.

In late 2018, two canids that are largely coyote were found on Galveston Island, Texas with red wolf alleles (gene expressions) left from a ghost population of red wolves. Since these alleles are from a different population from the red wolves in the North Carolina captive breeding program, there has been a proposal to selectively cross-breed the Galveston Island coyotes (Note: The purpose would be to selectively breed the animals to restore the lost red wolf genes to the current captive and experimental red wolf populations, while removing any introduced coyote genes. In addition to recovering the lost red wolf genetics, it would bolster the meager genetic diversity of the captive red wolves.) into the captive red wolf population. Another study published around the same time analyzing canid scat and hair samples in southwestern Louisiana found genetic evidence of red wolf ancestry in about 55% of sampled canids, with one such individual having between 78 and 100% red wolf ancestry, suggesting the possibility of more red wolf genes in the wild that may not be present in the captive population.

From 2015 to 2019, there were no red wolves released into the wild. But in March 2020, the FWS released a new breeding pair of red wolves, including a young male red wolf from St. Vincent Island, Florida into the Alligator River National Wildlife Refuge. The pair were unsuccessful at producing a litter of pups in the wild. On March 1, 2021, two male red wolves from Florida were paired with two female wild red wolves from eastern North Carolina and released into the wild. One of the male wolves was killed by a car shortly after being released into the wild. On April 30 and May 1, four adult red wolves were released into the wild and four red wolf pups were fostered by a wild female red wolf. In addition to the eight released wolves, the total number of red wolves living in the wild amount to nearly thirty wild individuals, including a dozen other wolves not wearing radio collars.

A study published in 2020 reported camera traps recorded "the presence of a large canid possessing wolf-like characters" in northeast Texas and later hair samples and tracks from the area indicated the presence of red wolves.

By late 2021, a total of six red wolves had been killed, including the four adults that had been released in the spring. Three of the released adults had been killed in vehicle collisions, two had died from unknown cases, and the fourth released adult had been shot by a landowner who feared the wolf was attempting to get his chickens. These losses dropped the number of wolves in the wild down to about 20 wild individuals. In the winter of 2021–2022, the Fish and Wildlife Services selected nine captive adult red wolves to be released into the wild. A family of five red wolves were released into the Pocosin Lakes National Wildlife Refuge, while two new breeding pairs of adult wolves were released into the Alligator River National Wildlife Refuge. The release of these new wolves brought the number of wild red wolves in eastern North Carolina up to less than 30 wild individuals.

On April 22, 2022, one of the breeding pairs of adult red wolves produced a litter of six wolf pups, four females and two males. This new litter of red wolf pups became the first litter born in the wild since 2018. As of 2023, there are between 15 and 17 wild red wolves in Alligator River National Wildlife Refuge.

=== Existing population ===
In April and May 2023, two captive male red wolves were paired with two wild female wolves in acclimation pens and were later released into the wild. At the same time, the wild breeding pair that produced a litter of pups the previous year gave birth to a second litter of 5 pups, 2 males and 3 females. A male wolf pup from a captive litter was fostered into the pack, and with this new addition, the family of red wolves, which was named the Milltail pack by FWS, has grown to 13 wild individuals. These six new pups have brought the wild population of red wolves up to 23–25 wild individuals.

In May 2023, two families of red wolves were placed in acclimation pens to be released into the wild in the Pocosin Lakes National Wildlife Refuge in Tyrrell County. One family consisted of a breeding pair and three pups, while the other consisted of a breeding pair, a yearling female, and four young pups that were born in the acclamation pen. In early June 2023, the two families of red wolves were released into the wild to roam through PLNWR. With the addition of these two separate packs, the wild population of red wolves had increased to about 35 wild individuals. In addition to the wild population, there are approximately 270 red wolves in zoos and captive breeding programs across the US.

=== Coyote interbreeding ===
Interbreeding with the coyote has been recognized as a threat affecting the restoration of red wolves. Adaptive management efforts are making progress in reducing the threat of coyotes to the red wolf population in northeastern North Carolina. Other threats, such as habitat fragmentation, disease, and human-caused mortality, are of concern in the restoration of red wolves. Efforts to reduce the threats are presently [when?] being explored.

By 1999, introgression of coyote genes was recognized as the single greatest threat to wild red wolf recovery and an adaptive management plan which included coyote sterilization has been successful, with coyote genes being reduced by 2015 to less than 4% of the wild red wolf population.

Since the 2014 programmatic review, the USFWS ceased implementing the red wolf adaptive management plan that was responsible for preventing red wolf hybridization with coyotes and allowed the release of captive-born red wolves into the wild population. Since then, the wild population has decreased from 100–115 red wolves to less than 30. Despite the controversy over the red wolf's status as a unique taxon, as well as the USFWS' apparent disinterest towards wolf conservation in the wild, the vast majority of public comments (including NC residents) submitted to the USFWS in 2017 over their new wolf management plan were in favor of the original wild conservation plan.

A 2016 genetic study of canid scats found that despite high coyote density inside the Red Wolf Experimental Population Area (RWEPA), hybridization occurs rarely (4% are hybrids).

=== Contested killing of re-introduced red wolves ===
High wolf mortality related to anthropogenic causes appeared to be the main factor limiting wolf dispersal westward from the RWEPA.

In 2012, the Southern Environmental Law Center filed a lawsuit against the North Carolina Wildlife Resources Commission for jeopardizing the existence of the wild red wolf population by allowing nighttime hunting of coyotes in the five-county restoration area in eastern North Carolina. A 2014 court-approved settlement agreement was reached that banned nighttime hunting of coyotes and requires permitting and reporting coyote hunting. In response to the settlement, the North Carolina Wildlife Resources Commission adopted a resolution requesting the USFWS to remove all wild red wolves from private lands, terminate recovery efforts, and declare red wolves extinct in the wild. This resolution came in the wake of a 2014 programmatic review of the red wolf conservation program conducted by The Wildlife Management Institute. The Wildlife Management Institute indicated the reintroduction of the red wolf was an incredible achievement. The report indicated that red wolves could be released and survive in the wild, but that illegal killing of red wolves threatens the long-term persistence of the population. The report stated that the USFWS needed to update its red wolf recovery plan, thoroughly evaluate its strategy for preventing coyote hybridization and increase its public outreach.

In 2014, the USFWS issued the first take permit for a red wolf to a private landowner. Since then, the USFWS issued several other take permits to landowners in the five-county restoration area. During June 2015, a landowner shot and killed a female red wolf after being authorized a take permit, causing a public outcry. In response, the Southern Environmental Law Center filed a lawsuit against the USFWS for violating the Endangered Species Act.

By 2016, the red wolf population of North Carolina had declined to 45–60 wolves. The largest cause of this decline was gunshot.

In June 2018, the USFWS announced a proposal that would limit the wolves' safe range to only Alligator River National Wildlife Refuge, where only about 35 wolves remain, thus allowing hunting on private land. In November 2018, Chief Judge Terrence W. Boyle found that the USFWS had violated its congressional mandate to protect the red wolf, and ruled that USFWS had no power to give landowners the right to shoot them.

== Relationship to humans ==
Since before European colonization of the Americas, the red wolf has featured prominently in Cherokee spiritual beliefs, where it is known as wa'ya (ᏩᏯ), and is said to be the companion of Kana'ti – the hunter and father of the Aniwaya or Wolf Clan. Traditionally, Cherokee people generally avoid killing red wolves, as such an act is believed to bring about the vengeance of the killed animals' pack-mates.

== Gallery ==
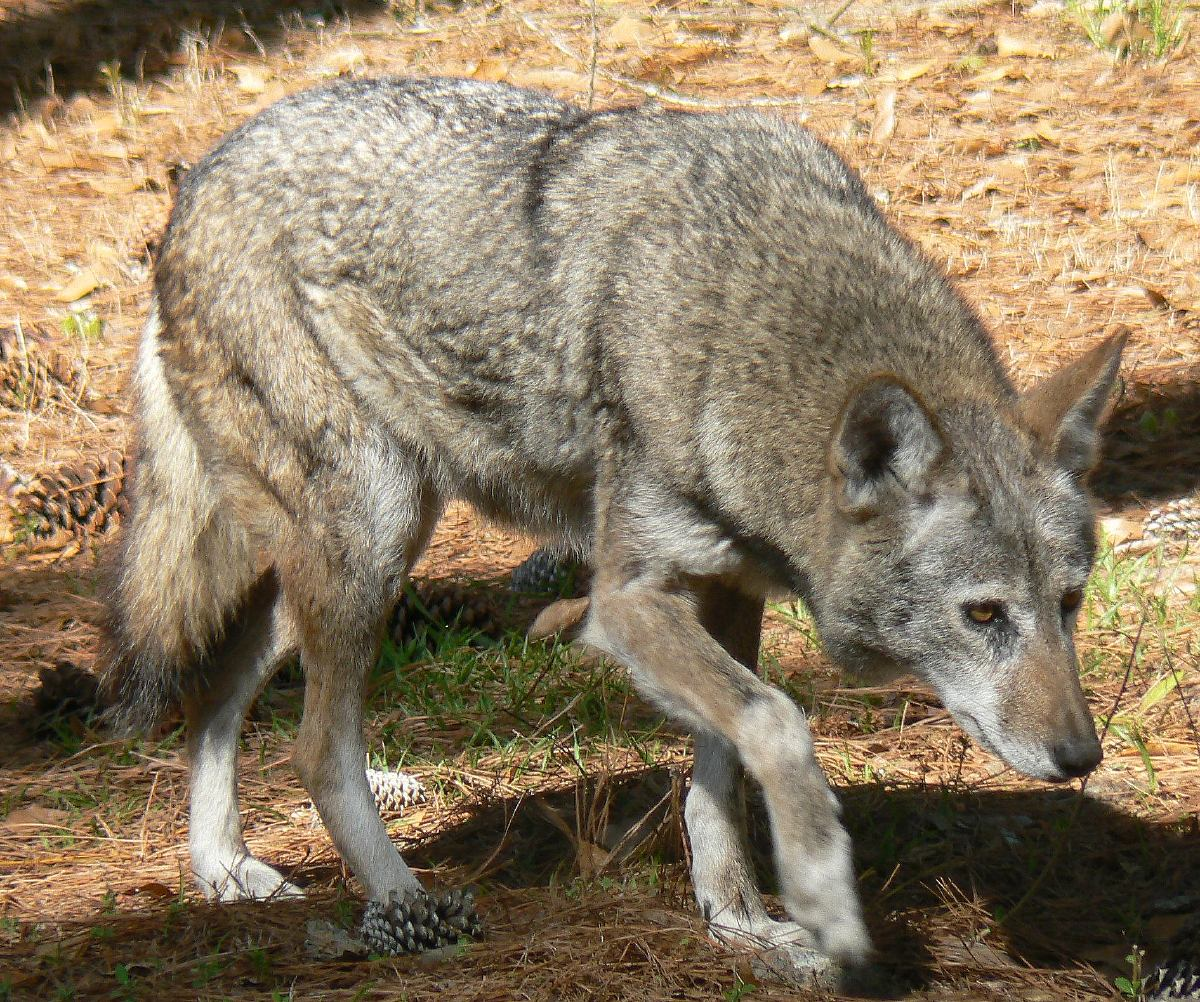
Showing color variation

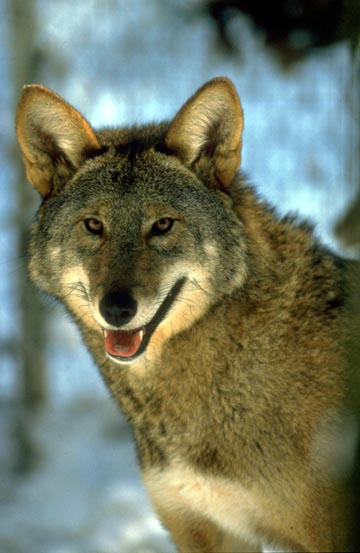
In winter

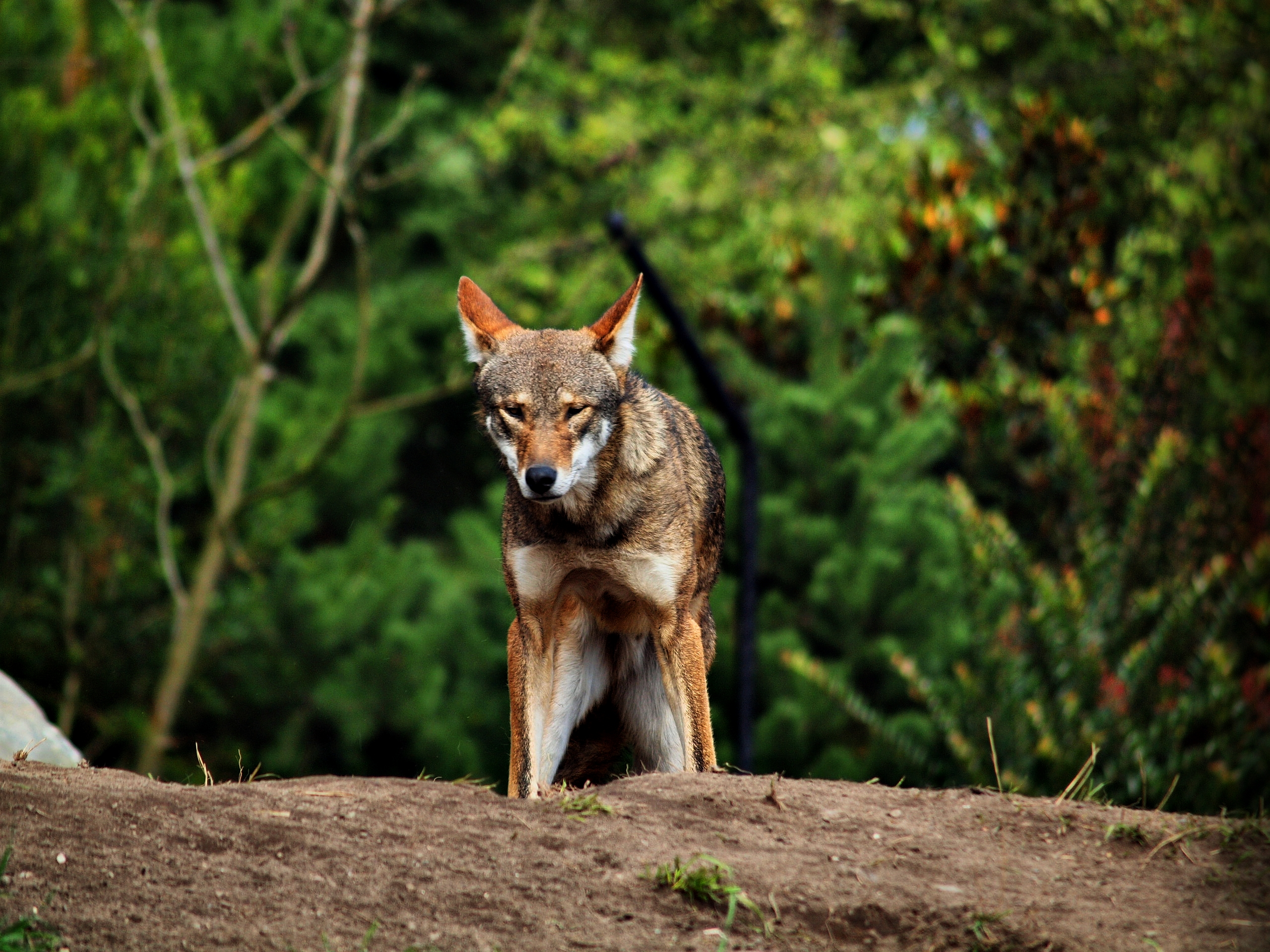
Color contrast

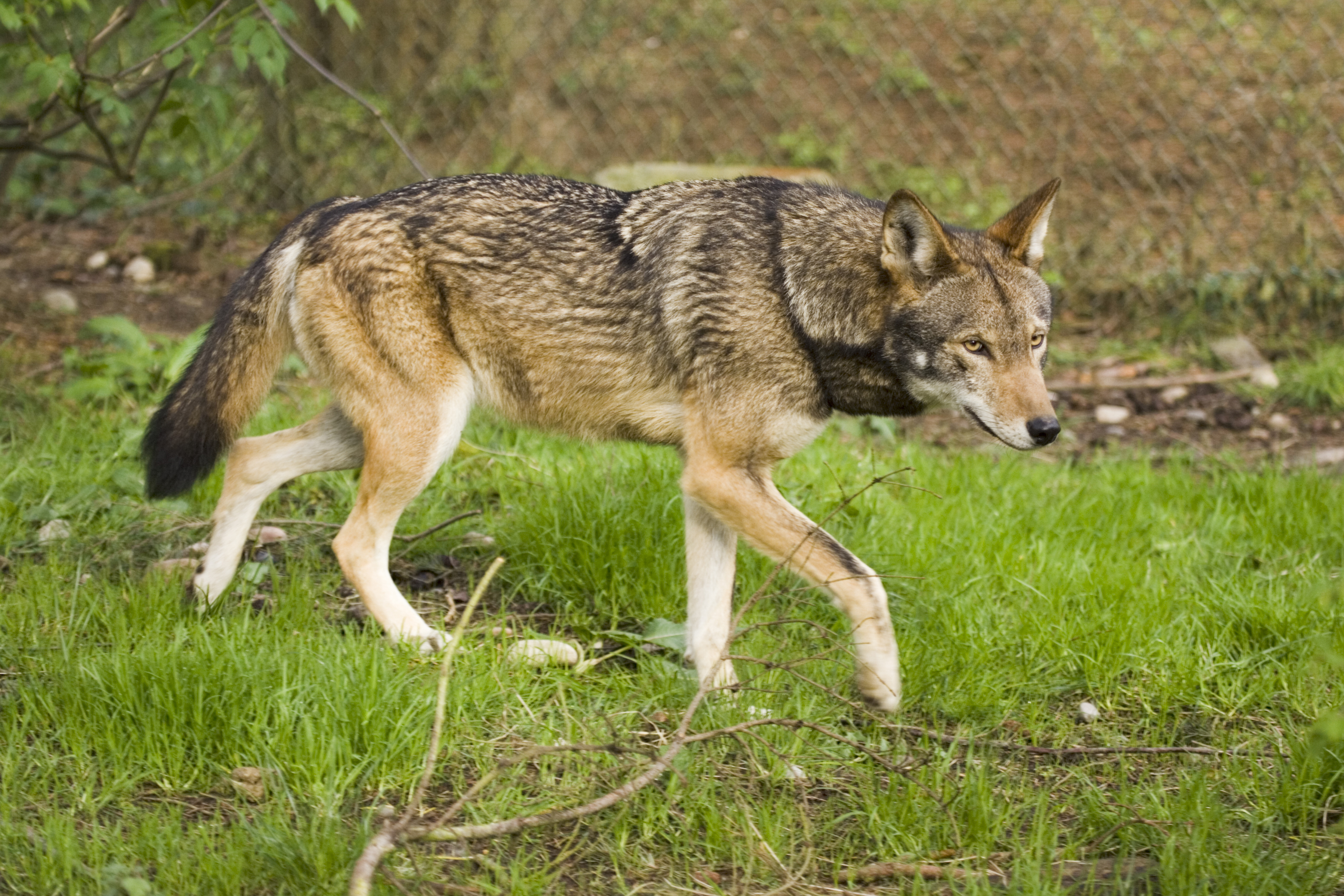
A red wolf in a breeding program. Fewer than 100 remain in the wild.

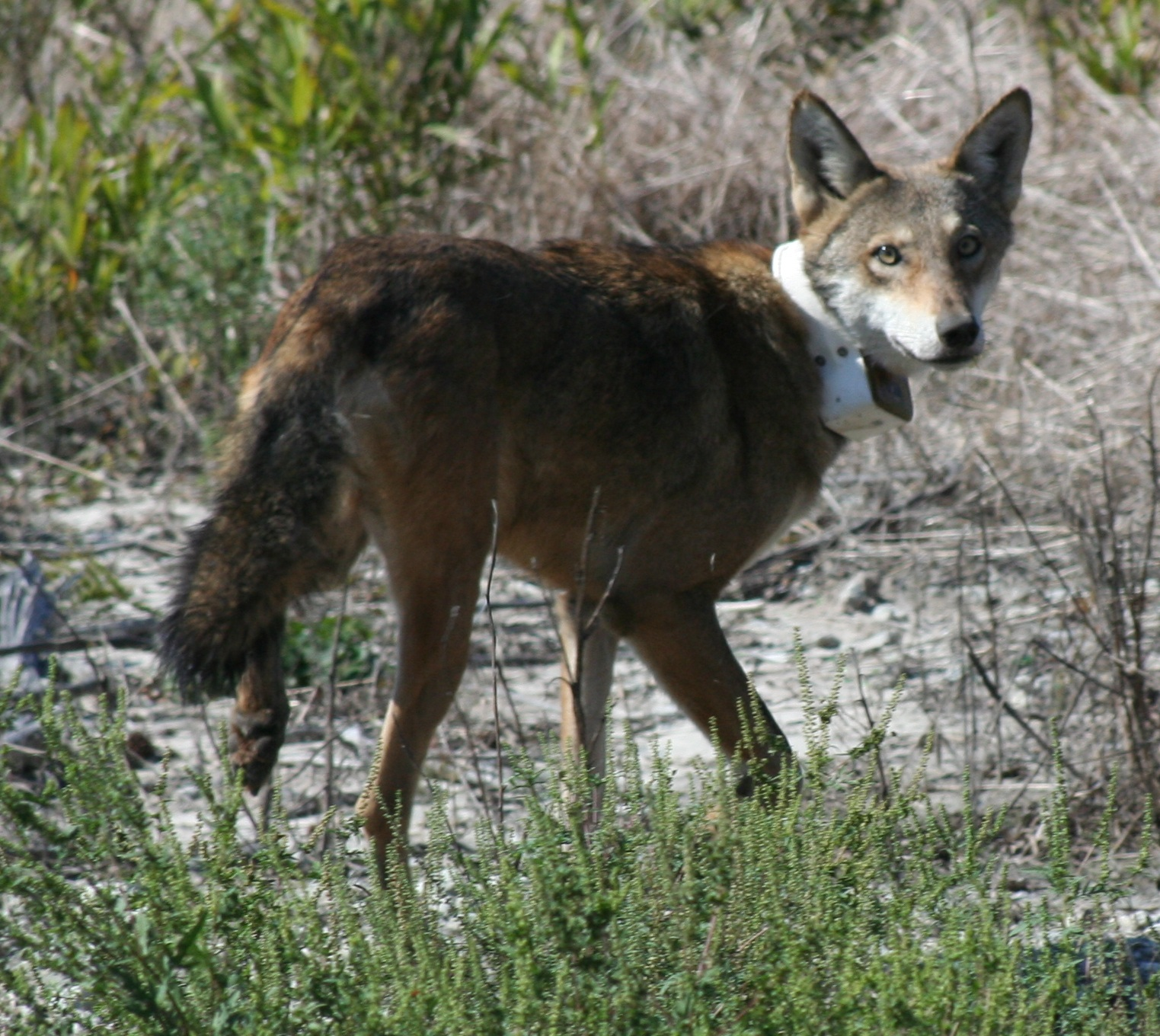
With radio collar

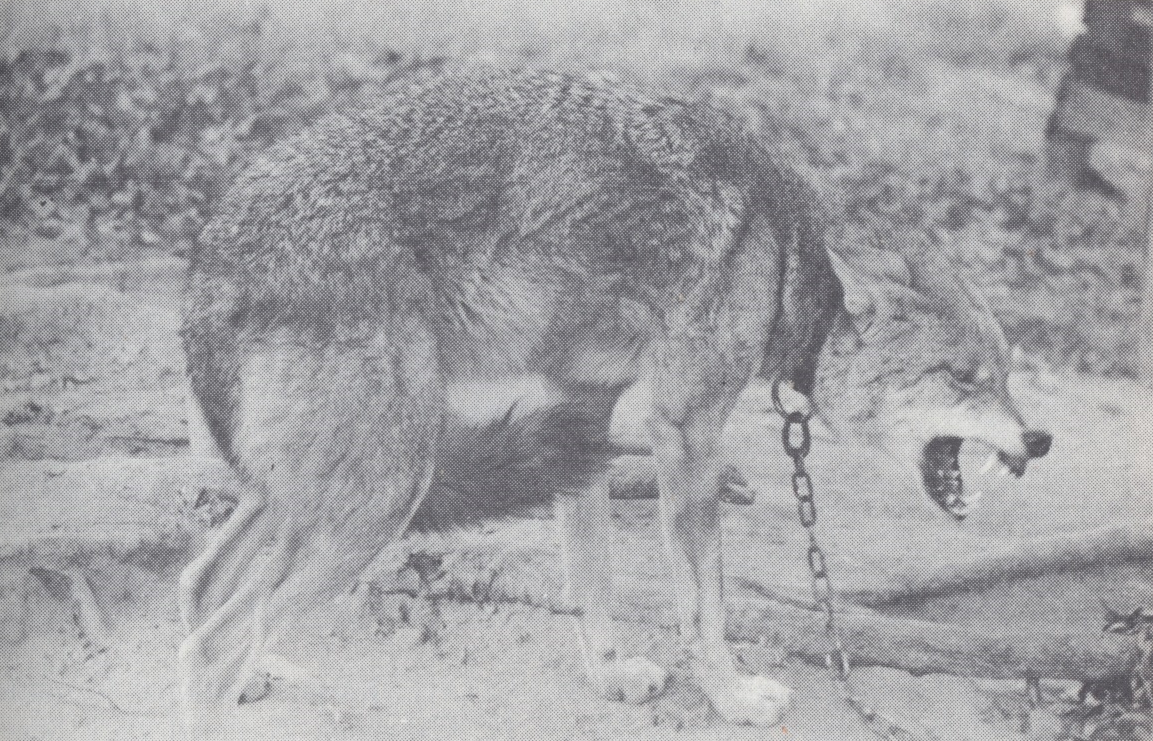
A captive red wolf from Oklahoma (1944)
