= List of canids =

Species in mammal family Canidae

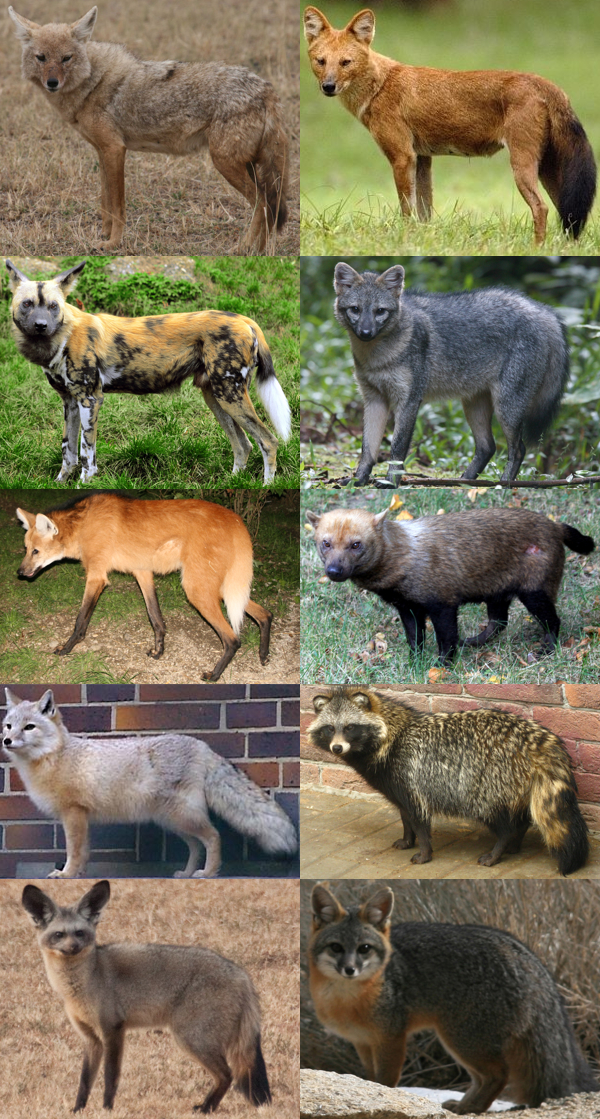
10 of the 13 extant canid genera left-to-right, top-to-bottom: Canis, Cuon, Lycaon, Cerdocyon, Chrysocyon, Speothos, Vulpes, Nyctereutes, Otocyon, and Urocyon

Canidae is a family of mammals in the order Carnivora, which includes domestic dogs, wolves, coyotes, foxes, jackals, dingoes, and many other extant and extinct dog-like mammals. A member of this family is called a canid; all extant species are a part of a single subfamily, Caninae, and are called canines. They are found on all continents except Antarctica, having arrived independently or accompanied human beings over extended periods of time. Canids vary in size, including tails, from the 2 meter (6 ft 7 in) wolf to the 46 cm (18 in) fennec fox. Population sizes range from the Falkland Islands wolf, extinct since 1876, to the domestic dog, which has a worldwide population of over 1 billion. The body forms of canids are similar, typically having long muzzles, upright ears, teeth adapted for cracking bones and slicing flesh, long legs, and bushy tails. Most species are social animals, living together in family units or small groups and behaving cooperatively. Typically, only the dominant pair in a group breeds, and a litter of young is reared annually in an underground den. Canids communicate by scent signals and vocalizations. One canid, the domestic dog, entered into a partnership with humans at least 14,000 years ago and today remains one of the most widely kept domestic animals.

The 13 extant genera and 37 species of Caninae are primarily split into two tribes: Canini, which includes 11 genera and 19 species, comprising the wolf-like Canina subtribe and the South American Cerdocyonina subtribe; and Vulpini, the fox-like canids, comprising 3 genera and 15 species. Not included in either tribe is the genus Urocyon, which includes 2 species, mainly comprising the gray fox and believed to be basal to the family. Additionally, one genus in Canini, Dusicyon, was composed of two recently extinct species, with the South American fox going extinct around 400 years ago and the Falkland Islands wolf going extinct in 1876.

In addition to the extant Caninae, Canidae contains two extinct subfamilies designated as Hesperocyoninae and Borophaginae. Extinct species have also been placed into Caninae, in both extant and extinct genera; at least 80 extinct Caninae species have been found, as well as over 70 species in Borophaginae and nearly 30 in Hesperocyoninae, though due to ongoing research and discoveries the exact number and categorization is not fixed. The earliest canids found belong to Hesperocyoninae, and are believed to have diverged from the existing Caniformia suborder around 37 million years ago.

== Conventions ==
IUCN Red List categories
Conservation status
- EX: Extinct (2 species)
- EW: Extinct in the wild (0 species)
- CR: Critically endangered (0 species)
- EN: Endangered (4 species)
- VU: Vulnerable (0 species)
- NT: Near threatened (5 species)
- LC: Least concern (26 species)

Other categories
- DD: Data deficient (0 species)
- NE: Not evaluated (1 species)

The author citation for the species or genus is given after the scientific name; parentheses around the author citation indicate that this was not the original taxonomic placement. Conservation status codes listed follow the International Union for Conservation of Nature (IUCN) Red List of Threatened Species. Range maps are provided wherever possible; if a range map is not available, a description of the canid's range is provided. Ranges are based on the IUCN Red List for that species, unless otherwise noted. All extinct species (or subspecies) listed alongside extant species went extinct after 1500 CE, and are indicated by a dagger symbol: "†".

== Classification ==
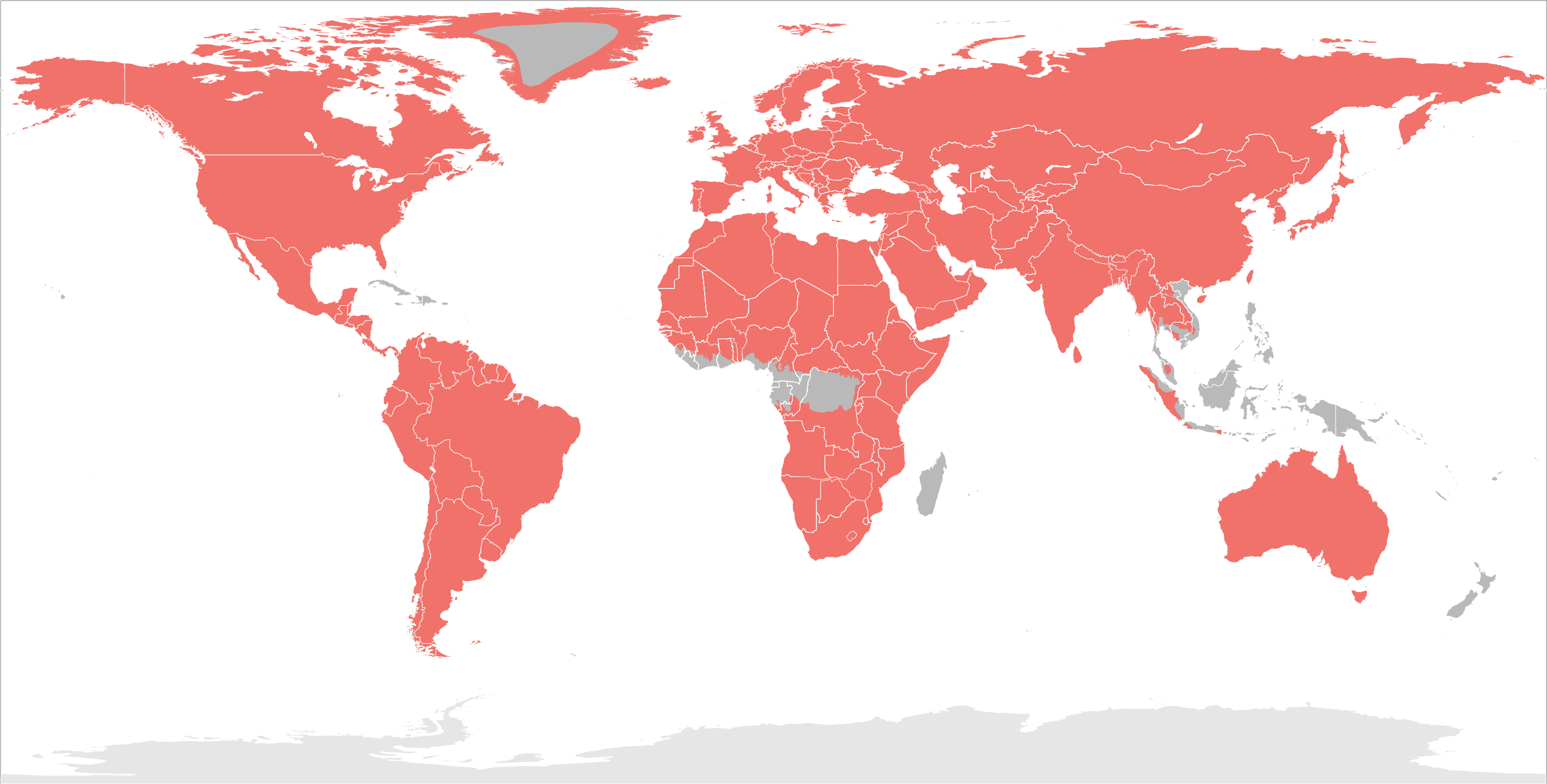
Canidae distribution

The family Canidae consists of 37 extant species belonging to 13 genera and divided into 194 extant subspecies, as well the extinct genus Dusicyon, comprising two extinct species, and 13 extinct wolf subspecies, which are the only canid species to go extinct since prehistoric times. This does not include hybrid species (such as wolfdogs or coywolves) or extinct prehistoric species (such as the dire wolf or Epicyon). Modern molecular studies indicate that the 13 genera can be grouped into 3 tribes or clades.

Subfamily Caninae

- Tribe Canini (true canines)
  - Subtribe Canina (wolf-like canids)
    - Genus Canis: six species
    - Genus Cuon: one species
    - Genus Lupulella: two species
    - Genus Lycaon: one species
  - Subtribe Cerdocyonina (South American canids)
    - Genus Atelocynus: one species
    - Genus Cerdocyon: one species
    - Genus Chrysocyon: one species
    - Genus Dusicyon†: two species
    - Genus Lycalopex: six species
    - Genus Speothos: one species
- Tribe Vulpini (true foxes)
  - Genus Nyctereutes: two species
  - Genus Otocyon: one species
  - Genus Vulpes: twelve species
- Genus Urocyon (gray foxes): two species

- Caninae
  - Canini
    - Canina
      - Canis
      - Cuon
      - Lupulella
      - Lycaon
    - Cerdocyonina
      - - Speothos
        - - Chrysocyon
          - Dusicyon†
      - - - Lycalopex
          - Cerdocyon
        - Atelocynus
  - Vulpini
    - Otocyon
    - - Nyctereutes
      - Vulpes
  - Urocyon

== Canids ==
The following classification is based on the taxonomy described by Mammal Species of the World (2005), with augmentation by generally accepted proposals made since using molecular phylogenetic analysis, such as the promotion of the African golden wolf to a separate species from the golden jackal, and splitting out the Lupulella genus from Canis. Range maps are based on IUCN range data. There are several additional proposals which are disputed, such as the promotion of the red wolf and eastern wolf as species from subspecies of the wolf, which are marked with a "(debated)" tag.

=== Subfamily Caninae ===
==== Tribe Canini ====
Genus Atelocynus – Cabrera, 1940 – one species
Common name	Scientific name and subspecies	Range	Size and ecology	IUCN status and estimated population (Note: Population figures rounded to the nearest hundred. Population trends as described by the International Union for Conservation of Nature.)
Short-eared dog	A. microtis (Cabrera, 1940) Two subspecies: A. m. microtis; A. m. sclateri	Western Amazon rainforest in South America	Size: 72–100 cm (28–39 in) long, plus 24–35 cm (9–14 in) tail Habitat: Wetlands, forest, and savanna Diet: Fish, insects, and small mammals, as well as fruit, birds, and crabs	NT Unknown

Genus Canis – Linnaeus, 1758 – six species
Common name	Scientific name and subspecies	Range	Size and ecology	IUCN status and estimated population
African wolf	C. lupaster Hemprich and Ehrenberg, 1832 Six subspecies: C. l. algirensis (Algerian wolf); C. l. anthus (Senegalese wolf); C. l. bea (Serengeti wolf); C. l. lupaster (Egyptian wolf); C. l. riparius (Somali wolf); C. l. soudanicus (Variegated wolf)	North and northeastern Africa	Size: 100 cm (39 in) long, plus 20 cm (8 in) tail Habitat: Grassland, shrubland, and savanna Diet: Wild boar and livestock, as well as other mammals and fruit	LC Unknown
Coyote	C. latrans Say, 1823 Nineteen subspecies: C. l. cagottis (Mexican coyote); C. l. clepticus (San Pedro Martir coyote); C. l. dickeyi (El Salvador coyote); C. l. frustor (Southeastern coyote); C. l. goldmani (Belize coyote); C. l. hondurensis (Honduras coyote); C. l. impavidus (Durango coyote); C. l. incolatus (Northern coyote); C. l. jamesi (Tiburón Island coyote); C. l. latrans (Plains coyote); C. l. lestes (Mountain coyote); C. l. mearnsi (Mearns' coyote); C. l. microdon (Lower Rio Grande coyote); C. l. ochropus (California valley coyote); C. l. peninsulae (Peninsula coyote); C. l. texensis (Texas plains coyote); C. l. thamnos (Northeastern coyote); C. l. umpquensis (Northwest coast coyote); C. l. vigilis (Colima coyote)	North America	Size: 100–135 cm (39–53 in) long, plus 40 cm (16 in) tail Habitat: Forest, desert, shrubland, and grassland Diet: Wide variety of foods, including both small and large mammals, fruit, and insects	LC 1 million+
Dog	C. familiaris Linnaeus, 1758	Worldwide	Size: Varies by breed Habitat: Domesticated Diet: Varied	NE 1 billion
Ethiopian wolf	C. simensis Rüppell, 1840 Two subspecies: C. s. citernii (Southern Ethiopian wolf); C. s. simensis (Northern Ethiopian wolf)	Ethiopian Highlands	Size: 84–100 cm (33–39 in) long, plus 27–40 cm (11–16 in) tail Habitat: Inland wetlands, grassland, shrubland, and rocky areas Diet: Rodents as well as small mammals	EN 450
Golden jackal	C. aureus Linnaeus, 1758 Six subspecies: C. a. aureus (Persian jackal); C. a. cruesemanni (Indochinese jackal); C. a. indicus (Indian jackal); C. a. moreoticus (European jackal); C. a. naria (Sri Lankan jackal); C. a. syriacus (Syrian jackal)	Eastern Europe, Middle East, and southern Asia	Size: 60–132 cm (24–52 in) long, plus 20–30 cm (8–12 in) tail Habitat: Forest, grassland, shrubland, and savanna Diet: Wide variety of foods, including small to large mammals, birds, fish, fruit, and insects	LC Unknown, but at least 150,000
Wolf	C. lupus Linnaeus, 1758 39 subspecies: C. l. albus (Tundra wolf); C. l. alces (Kenai Peninsula wolf)†; C. l. arabs (Arabian wolf); C. l. arctos (Arctic wolf); C. l. baileyi (Mexican wolf); C. l. beothucus (Newfoundland wolf)†; C. l. bernardi (Bernard's wolf)†; C. l. campestris (Steppe wolf); C. l. chanco (Mongolian wolf/Himalayan wolf); C. l. columbianus (British Columbia wolf); C. l. crassodon (Vancouver Island wolf); C. l. cristaldii (Sicilian wolf)†; C. l. dingo (Dingo/New Guinea singing dog); C. l. floridanus (Florida black wolf)†; C. l. fuscus (Cascade mountain wolf); C. l. gregoryi (Gregory's wolf); C. l. griseoalbus (Manitoba wolf)†; C. l. hattai (Hokkaidō wolf)†; C. l. hodophilax (Japanese wolf)†; C. l. hudsonicus (Hudson Bay wolf); C. l. irremotus (Northern Rocky Mountain wolf); C. l. italicus (Italian wolf) (debated); C. l. labradorius (Labrador wolf); C. l. ligoni (Alexander Archipelago wolf); C. l. lupus (Eurasian wolf); C. l. lycaon (Eastern wolf) (debated); C. l. mackenzii (Mackenzie River wolf); C. l. manningi (Baffin Island wolf); C. l. mogollonensis (Mogollon mountain wolf)†; C. l. monstrabilis (Texas wolf)†; C. l. nubilus (Great Plains wolf)†; C. l. occidentalis (Northwestern wolf); C. l. orion (Greenland wolf); C. l. pallipes (Indian wolf); C. l. pambasileus (Alaskan Interior wolf); C. l. rufus (Red wolf) (debated); C. l. signatus (Iberian wolf) (debated); C. l. tundrarum (Alaskan tundra wolf); C. l. youngi (Southern Rocky Mountain wolf)†	Eurasia and northern North America	Size: 105–160 cm (41–63 in) long, plus 29–50 cm (11–20 in) tail Habitat: Forest, desert, rocky areas, shrubland, grassland, and inland wetlands Diet: Large ungulates, as well as small animals, carrion, and berries	LC 300,000

Genus Cerdocyon – C. E. H. Smith, 1839 – one species
Common name	Scientific name and subspecies	Range	Size and ecology	IUCN status and estimated population
Crab-eating fox	C. thous (Linnaeus, 1766) Five subspecies: C. t. aquilus; C. t. azarae; C. t. entrerianus; C. t. germanus; C. t. thous	Eastern and northern South America	Size: 64 cm (25 in) long, plus 28 cm (11 in) tail Habitat: Forest, savanna, shrubland, grassland, and inland wetlands Diet: Crabs and insects, as well as rodents, birds, turtles, eggs, fruit, and carrion	LC Unknown

Genus Chrysocyon – C. E. H. Smith, 1839 – one species
Common name	Scientific name and subspecies	Range	Size and ecology	IUCN status and estimated population
Maned wolf	C. brachyurus (Illiger, 1815)	Central South America	Size: 100–130 cm (39–51 in) long, plus 45 cm (18 in) tail Habitat: Forest, wetlands, grassland, shrubland, and savanna Diet: Fruit, arthropods, and small and medium vertebrates	NT 17,000

Genus Cuon – Hodgson, 1838 – one species
Common name	Scientific name and subspecies	Range	Size and ecology	IUCN status and estimated population
Dhole	C. alpinus (Pallas, 1811) Three subspecies: C. a. alpinus (Ussuri dhole); C. a. hesperius (Tien Shan dhole)†; C. a. sumatrensis (Sumatran dhole)	Southeast Asia	Size: 90 cm (35 in) long, plus 40–45 cm (16–18 in) tail Habitat: Forest, grassland, and shrubland Diet: Ungulates, as well as small rodents and hares	EN 1,000–2,200

Genus Dusicyon† – C. E. H. Smith, 1839 – two species
Common name	Scientific name and subspecies	Range	Size and ecology	IUCN status and estimated population
Falkland Islands wolf†	D. australis (Kerr, 1792)	Falkland Islands at tip of South America	Size: Unknown Habitat: Grassland and shrubland Diet: Unknown	EX 0 (Note: The Falklands Island wolf is believed to have been driven extinct in 1876)
South American fox†	D. avus (Burmeister, 1866)	Southern South America	Size: Unknown Habitat: Grassland and shrubland Diet: Unknown	EX 0 (Note: The South American fox is believed to have gone extinct sometime between 1454 and 1626)

Genus Lupulella – Hilzheimer, 1906 – two species
Common name	Scientific name and subspecies	Range	Size and ecology	IUCN status and estimated population
Black-backed jackal	L. mesomelas (Schreber, 1775) Two subspecies: L. m. mesomelas (Cape black-backed jackal); L. m. schmidti (East African black-backed jackal)	Southern Africa and eastern Africa	Size: 60–95 cm (24–37 in) long, plus 16–40 cm (6–16 in) tail Habitat: Marine intertidal, forest, desert, grassland, shrubland, and savanna Diet: Small to medium-sized mammals and birds	LC Unknown
Side-striped jackal	L. adustus (Sundevall, 1847) Seven subspecies: L. a. adustus (Sundevall's side-striped jackal); L. a. bweha; L. a. centralis; L. a. grayi; L. a. kaffensis (Kaffa side-striped jackal); L. a. lateralis; L. a. notatus (East African side-striped jackal)	Central Africa	Size: 69–81 cm (27–32 in) long, plus 30–41 cm (12–16 in) tail Habitat: Forest, shrubland, savanna, grassland, and inland wetlands Diet: Small to medium-sized mammals and fruit, as well as birds, insects, grass, and carrion	LC 3 million

Genus Lycalopex – Burmeister, 1854 – six species
Common name	Scientific name and subspecies	Range	Size and ecology	IUCN status and estimated population
Culpeo	L. culpeo (Molina, 1782) Six subspecies: L. c. andinus; L. c. culpaeus; L. c. lycoides; L. c. magellanicus; L. c. reissii; L. c. smithersi	Western South America	Size: 95–132 cm (37–52 in) long, plus 32–44 cm (13–17 in) tail Habitat: Forest, rocky areas, grassland, shrubland, and savanna Diet: Rodents and lagomorphs, as well as livestock and guanacos	LC Unknown
Darwin's fox	L. fulvipes (Martin, 1837)	Limited areas in southern Chile	Size: 48–59 cm (19–23 in) long, plus 18–26 cm (7–10 in) tail Habitat: Forest and shrubland Diet: Small mammals, insects, crabs, and fruit	EN 600-2,500
Hoary fox	L. vetulus (Lund, 1842)	South-central Brazil	Size: 49–71 cm (19–28 in) long, plus 25–38 cm (10–15 in) tail Habitat: Savanna Diet: Insects, as well as small rodents, birds, reptiles, and fruit	LC Unknown
Pampas fox	L. gymnocercus (Waldheim, 1814) Five subspecies: L. g. antiquus; L. g. domeykoanus; L. g. gracilis; L. g. gymnocercus; L. g. maulinicus	Southern South America	Size: 51–74 cm (20–29 in) long, plus 25–41 cm (10–16 in) tail Habitat: Forest, shrubland, and savanna Diet: Small rodents, hares, birds, insects, and fruit, as well as carrion	LC Unknown
Sechuran fox	L. sechurae (Thomas, 1900)	Sechura Desert in southwestern Ecuador and northwestern Peru	Size: 50–78 cm (20–31 in) long, plus 27–34 cm (11–13 in) tail Habitat: Forest, desert, grassland, and shrubland Diet: Fruit and seeds, as well as small rodents, birds, reptiles, insects, scorpions, and carrion	NT 15,000
South American gray fox	L. griseus (Gray, 1837)	Southern South America	Size: 50–66 cm (20–26 in) long, plus 12–34 cm (5–13 in) tail Habitat: Forest, grassland, and shrubland Diet: Small rodents, hares, and carrion	LC Unknown

Genus Lycaon – Brookes, 1827 – one species
Common name	Scientific name and subspecies	Range	Size and ecology	IUCN status and estimated population
African wild dog	L. pictus (Temminck, 1820) Five subspecies: L. p. lupinus (East African wild dog); L. p. manguensis (West African wild dog); L. p. pictus (Cape wild dog); L. p. sharicus (Chadian wild dog); L. p. somalicus (Somali wild dog)	Scattered areas of Africa. Extant regions in red; probably extant region in yellow.	Size: 76–112 cm (30–44 in) long, plus 30–42 cm (12–17 in) tail Habitat: Forest, grassland, shrubland, savanna, and desert Diet: Medium-sized antelope	EN 1,400

Genus Speothos – Lund, 1839 – one species
Common name	Scientific name and subspecies	Range	Size and ecology	IUCN status and estimated population
Bush dog	S. venaticus (Lund, 1842) Three subspecies: S. v. panamensis (Panamanian bush dog); S. v. venaticus (South American bush dog); S. v. wingei (Southern bush dog)	Northern South America	Size: 57–75 cm (22–30 in) long, plus 12–15 cm (5–6 in) tail Habitat: Shrubland, forest, grassland, and savanna Diet: Small and medium mammals, as well as birds, reptiles, and fruit	NT 15,000

==== Tribe Vulpini ====
Genus Nyctereutes – Temminck, 1839 – two species
Common name	Scientific name and subspecies	Range	Size and ecology	IUCN status and estimated population
Common raccoon dog	N. procyonoides (Gray, 1834) Four subspecies: N. p. procyonoides (Chinese raccoon dog); N. p. koreensis (Korean raccoon dog); N. p. orestes (Yunnan raccoon dog); N. p. ussuriensis (Ussuri raccoon dog)	Mainland Eastern Asia, introduced to Central and Eastern Europe (note: map includes range of N. viverrinus)	Size: 49–71 cm (19–28 in) long, plus 15–23 cm (6–9 in) tail Habitat: Forest, grassland, and shrubland Diet: Insects, rodents, amphibians, birds, fish, and reptiles, as well as fruit, nuts, and berries	LC Unknown, but at least 1.5 million in fur farms
Japanese raccoon dog	N. viverrinus (Temminck, 1838)	Japan	Size: 49–71 cm (19–28 in) long, plus 15–23 cm (6–9 in) tail Habitat: Forest, grassland, and shrubland Diet: Insects, rodents, amphibians, birds, fish, and reptiles, as well as fruit, nuts, and berries	NE Unknown

Genus Otocyon – Müller, 1835 – one species
Common name	Scientific name and subspecies	Range	Size and ecology	IUCN status and estimated population
Bat-eared fox	O. megalotis (Desmarest, 1822) Two subspecies: O. m. megalotis; O. m. virgatus	Southern and Eastern Africa (megalotis in green, virgatus in red)	Size: 46–61 cm (18–24 in) long, plus 23–34 cm (9–13 in) tail Habitat: Grassland, shrubland, and savanna Diet: Harvester termites as well as other arthropods	LC Unknown

Genus Vulpes – Frisch, 1775 – twelve species
Common name	Scientific name and subspecies	Range	Size and ecology	IUCN status and estimated population
Arctic fox	V. lagopus (Linnaeus, 1758) Five subspecies: V. l. lagopus (Common Arctic Fox); V. l. beringensis (Bering Islands Arctic fox); V. l. foragoapusis (Greenland Arctic fox); V. l. fuliginosus (Iceland Arctic fox); V. l. pribilofensis (Pribilof Islands Arctic fox)	Arctic North America and Eurasia	Size: 50–75 cm (20–30 in) long, plus 25–43 cm (10–17 in) tail Habitat: Grassland Diet: Lemmings, as well as other rodents, birds, and reindeer	LC Unknown
Bengal fox	V. bengalensis (Shaw, 1800)	India	Size: 39–58 cm (15–23 in) long, plus 25–32 cm (10–13 in) tail Habitat: Grassland and shrubland Diet: Arthropods, rodents, reptiles, fruit, and birds	LC Unknown
Blanford's fox	V. cana Blanford, 1877	The Middle East and Central Asia	Size: 34–47 cm (13–19 in) long, plus 26–36 cm (10–14 in) tail Habitat: Desert and rocky areas Diet: Fruit and insects	LC Unknown
Cape fox	V. chama (A Smith, 1833)	Southern Africa	Size: 45–61 cm (18–24 in) long, plus 25–41 cm (10–16 in) tail Habitat: Rocky areas, grassland, shrubland, and savanna Diet: Fruit and insects	LC 20,000
Corsac fox	V. corsac (Linnaeus, 1768) Three subspecies: V. c. corsac; V. c. kalmykorum; V. c. turkmenicus	Central Asia	Size: 45–60 cm (18–24 in) long, plus 19–34 cm (7–13 in) tail Habitat: Desert, grassland, and shrubland Diet: Insects and small rodents	LC Unknown
Fennec fox	V. zerda (Zimmermann, 1780)	Northern Africa	Size: 33–40 cm (13–16 in) long, plus 13–23 cm (5–9 in) tail Habitat: Desert and marine coastal/supratidal Diet: Rodents, insects, birds, eggs, and rabbits	LC Unknown
Kit fox	V. macrotis Merriam, 1888 Two subspecies: V. m. macrotis; V. m. mutica (San Joaquin kit fox)	Western North America	Size: 46–54 cm (18–21 in) long, plus 25–34 cm (10–13 in) tail Habitat: Shrubland, savanna, and grassland Diet: Rodents, rabbits, invertebrates, birds, lizards, and snakes	LC Unknown
Pale fox	V. pallida (Cretzschmar, 1827) Five subspecies: V. p. cyrenaica; V. p. edwardsi; V. p. harterti; V. p. oertzeni; V. p. pallida	Upper middle Africa	Size: 38–55 cm (15–22 in) long, plus 23–29 cm (9–11 in) tail Habitat: Desert, grassland, shrubland, and savanna Diet: Plants and berries as well as rodents, reptiles, and insects	LC 10,000–100,000
Rüppell's fox	V. rueppellii (Schinz, 1825)	Northern Africa and the Middle East	Size: 35–56 cm (14–22 in) long, plus 25–39 cm (10–15 in) tail Habitat: Desert, shrubland, and marine coastal/supratidal Diet: Small mammals, lizards, birds, and insects, as well as fruit and succulents	LC Unknown
Red fox	V. vulpes (Linnaeus, 1758) 44 subspecies: V. v. abietorum (British Columbian fox); V. v. alascensis (Northern Alaskan fox); V. v. alpherakyi (Eastern Trans-Caucasian fox); V. v. anatolica (Anatolian fox); V. v. arabica (Arabian red fox); V. v. atlantica (Atlas fox); V. v. bangsi (Labrador fox); V. v. barbara (Barbary fox); V. v. beringiana (Anadyr fox); V. v. cascadensis (Cascade red fox); V. v. caucasica (North Caucasian fox); V. v. crucigera (European fox); V. v. daurica (Trans-Baikal fox); V. v. deletrix (Newfoundland fox); V. v. dolichocrania (Ussuri fox); V. v. dorsalis; V. v. flavescens (Turkmenian fox); V. v. fulvus (American red fox); V. v. harrimani (Afghan red fox); V. v. hoole (Southern Chinese fox); V. v. ichnusae (Sardinian fox); V. v. indutus (Cyprus fox); V. v. jakutensis (Yakutsk fox); V. v. japonica (Japanese fox); V. v. karagan (Karaganka fox); V. v. kenaiensis (Kenai Peninsula fox); V. v. kurdistanica (Trans-Caucasian fox); V. v. macroura (Wasatch Mountains fox); V. v. montana (Hill fox); V. v. necator (Sierra Nevada red fox); V. v. niloticus (Nile fox); V. v. ochroxantha (Turkestan fox); V. v. palaestina (Palestinian fox); V. v. peculiosa (Korean fox); V. v. pusilla (White-footed fox); V. v. regalis (Northern plains fox); V. v. rubricosa (Nova Scotia fox); V. v. schrencki (Sakhalin fox); V. v. silacea (Iberian fox); V. v. splendidissima (Kuril Islands fox); V. v. stepensis (Steppe red fox); V. v. tobolica (Tobol'sk fox); V. v. tschiliensis (Northern Chinese fox); V. v. vulpes (Scandinavian red fox)	North America, Europe, Asia, and Australia	Size: 62–72 cm (24–28 in) long, plus 40 cm (16 in) tail Habitat: Shrubland, grassland, inland wetlands, forest, and desert Diet: Small rodents, as well as birds, larger mammals, reptiles, insects, and fish	LC Unknown
Swift fox	V. velox (Say, 1823)	Western grasslands of North America	Size: 48–54 cm (19–21 in) long, plus 25–34 cm (10–13 in) tail Habitat: Grassland Diet: Rabbits, mice, ground squirrels, birds, insects and lizards, as well as grasses and fruit	LC Unknown
Tibetan fox	V. ferrilata Hodgson, 1842	High plateaus in Nepal and western China	Size: 49–70 cm (19–28 in) long, plus 22–29 cm (9–11 in) tail Habitat: Desert, rocky areas, grassland, and shrubland Diet: Pikas, as well as carrion and other small mammals	LC Unknown

==== Urocyon ====
Genus Urocyon – Baird, 1857 – two species
Common name	Scientific name and subspecies	Range	Size and ecology	IUCN status and estimated population
Gray fox	U. cinereoargenteus (Schreber, 1775) Sixteen subspecies: U. c. borealis; U. c. californicus; U. c. cinereoargenteus; U. c. costaricensis; U. c. floridanus; U. c. fraterculus; U. c. furvus; U. c. guatemalae; U. c. madrensis; U. c. nigrirostris; U. c. ocythous; U. c. orinomus; U. c. peninsularis; U. c. scottii; U. c. townsendi; U. c. venezuelae	North America and Central America	Size: 53–66 cm (21–26 in) long, plus 28–44 cm (11–17 in) tail Habitat: Forest and shrubland Diet: Rabbits, voles, shrews, and birds, as well as insects and fruit	LC Unknown
Island fox	U. littoralis (Baird, 1857) Six subspecies: U. l. catalinae; U. l. clementae; U. l. dickeyi; U. l. littoralis; U. l. santacruzae; U. l. santarosae	Channel Islands of California	Size: 46–63 cm (18–25 in) long, plus 12–32 cm (5–13 in) tail Habitat: Marine intertidal, forest, grassland, and shrubland Diet: Fruit, insects, birds, eggs, crabs, lizards, and small mammals	NT 4,000
