= Wepwawet =

Ancient Egyptian god of war

- God of war, royalty, and funerary rites
- Wepwawet, the opener of ways. Wepwawet appears grey in the Temple of Seti I, though this is likely only due to loss of pigmentation over time.
Name in hieroglyphs
wp N31 t Z2 E18
- Major cult center: Lycopolis, Abydos
- Animals: Wolves
- Symbol: Wolf, Jackal, the mace, bow and arrows.

In Egyptian mythology, Wepwawet (hieroglyphic wp-wꜣwt; also rendered Upuaut, Wep-wawet, Wepawet, Apuat, and Ophois) was originally a jackal deity of funerary rites, war, and royalty, whose cult centre was Asyut in Upper Egypt (Lycopolis in the Greco-Roman period). His name means opener of the ways and he is often depicted as a wolf standing at the prow of a solar-boat. Some interpret that Wepwawet was seen as a scout, going out to clear routes for the army to proceed forward. One inscription from the Sinai states that Wepwawet "opens the way" to king Sekhemkhet's victory. In royal and religious processions, Wepwawet was often depicted on the first standard, opening the way for subsequent standards. He also stands at the prow of the barque of Ra, usually in human-headed form.

Wepwawet originally was seen as a jackal, or, according to some, a wolf deity, with his cult center being at the Lycopolis, (meaning city of wolves in Greek). He is one of the earliest Egyptian Gods on record. Wepwawet was heavily seen in association with royalty and the Pharaoh (My face is that of Wepwawet, Pyramid Texts), symbolizing and protecting their rise to power, accompanying them on hunts (in which capacity he was titled [one with] sharp arrows more powerful than the gods alone) or in the pharaoh's ascent to the Duat, or afterlife.

Over time, the connection to war and thus to death led to Wepwawet also being seen as one who opened the ways to, and through, Duat, for the spirits of the dead. Through this, Wepwawet became associated with Anubis, a deity that was worshiped in Asyut, eventually being considered his brother.

The Pyramid Texts state that Wepwawet was born in the Peru-nu, the sacred shrine of the goddess Wadjet, while an alternative myth suggests he emerged from a tamarisk bush. Consequently, Wepwawet is often confused with Anubis. This deity appears in the temple of Seti I at Abydos.

In Egyptian art, Wepwawet was depicted as a black jackal, or as a man with the head of a jackal. In the temple of Seti I at Abydos, Wepwawet appears to have grey-colored fur, though this is likely due to loss of pigmentation, as elsewhere in the temple, black paint is almost entirely faded. In rare cases, he appears in fully human form.

He was sometimes depicted dressed as a soldier, as well as carrying other military equipment—a mace and a bow.

For what generally is considered to be lauding purposes of the pharaohs, a later myth briefly was circulated claiming that Wepwawet was born at the sanctuary of Wadjet, the sacred site for the oldest goddess of Lower Egypt that is located in the heart of Lower Egypt. Consequently, Wepwawet, who had hitherto been the standard of Upper Egypt alone, formed an integral part of royal rituals, symbolizing the unification of Egypt.

In later Pyramid Texts, Wepwawet is called "Ra" who has gone up from the horizon, perhaps as the "opener" of the sky. In the later Egyptian funerary context, Wepwawet assists at the Opening of the mouth ceremony and guides the deceased into the netherworld.

== Etymology ==
In Egyptian hieroglyphs, Wepwawet's name is rendered as wp-wꜣwt, and translates from the Egyptian language as "opener of ways," with wpj meaning "to open/split" and wꜣwt being the direct genitive construction of the plural of wꜣt, meaning "road."

Though there are several ways to write Wepwawet's name in hieroglyphs, similar to other gods such as Horus, Wepwawet has a unique hieroglyph specific to him which resembles a jackal on a standard (𓃧). The hieroglyph which represents Wepwawet resembles similar ones used for Anubis (𓃣, 𓃢) due to their association with one another.

== In popular culture ==
In Crusader Kings III, God Wepwawet is the supreme deity of the Kordofan faith.

Wepwawet is the personal god or totem of Thu, the main character in the Lady of the Reeds books by Canadian author Pauline Gedge (House of Dreams, 1994; and House of Illusions, 1996).

== Animal origin ==
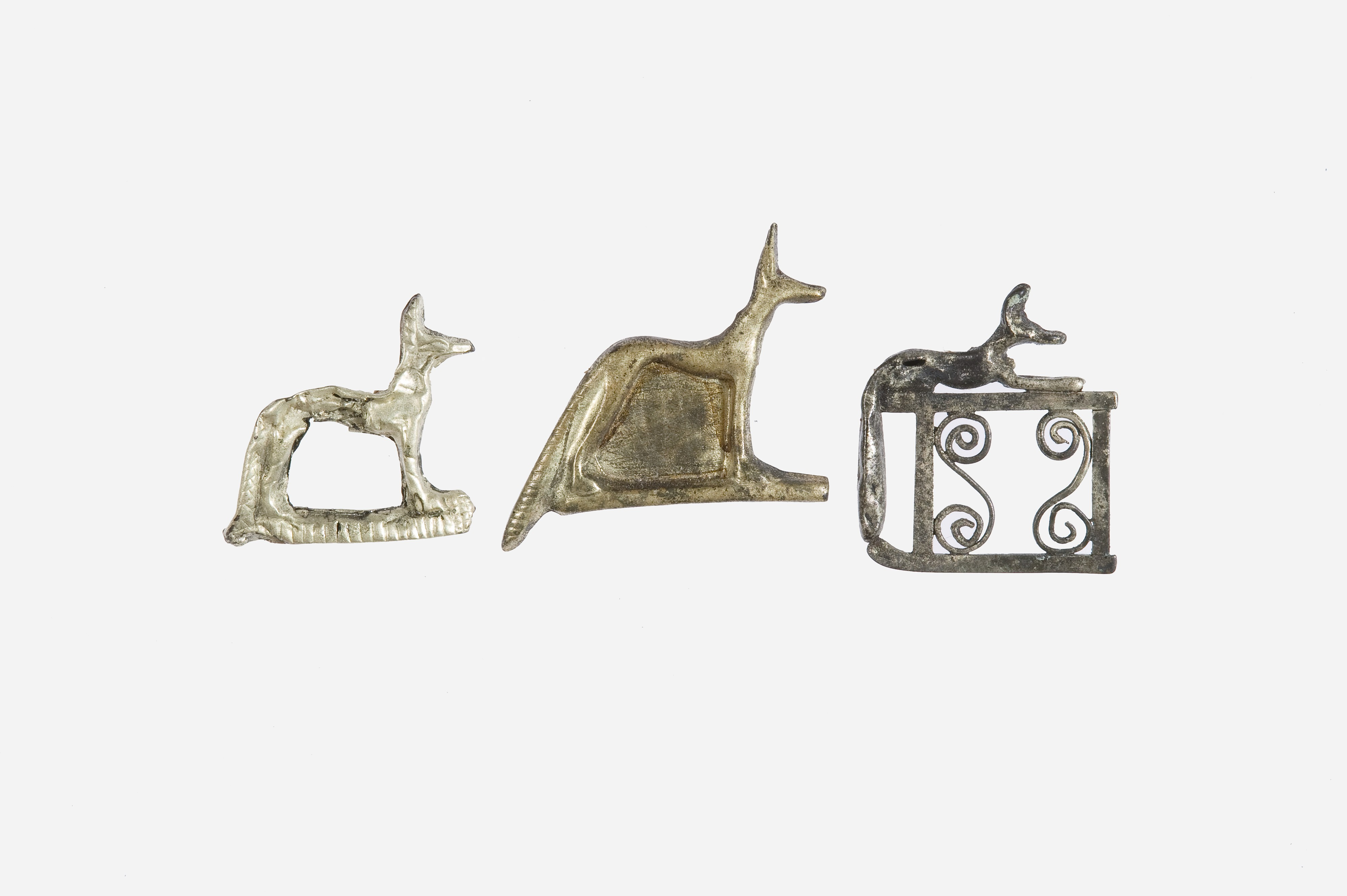
Jackal amulets in the form of Wepwawet

While the exact species of animal represented by the Ancient Egyptian sꜢb / sAb animal (Jackal) is unknown, the African wolf (Canis lupaster) was one species thought to depict and the template of numerous Ancient Egyptian deities, including Wepwawet. Other species theorized include the black-backed jackal also called the silver-backed Jackal (C. mesomelas or Lupulella mesomelas) and golden jackal or Asiatic jackal (Canis aureus).

The Egyptian jackal was listed as a subspecies of the golden jackal but molecular and osteological data has established that it is a unique species in its own right. It is native to Egypt, Libya, and Ethiopia, though its post-Pleistocene range once encompassed the Palestine region.

Inter-breeding between species also cannot be ruled out, and it has been posited that a species sharing the characteristics of both African jackal and wolf species could be the missing link, such as the combination of C. aureas and C. lupus lupaster appearing as Canis aureus lupaster.

== Gallery ==
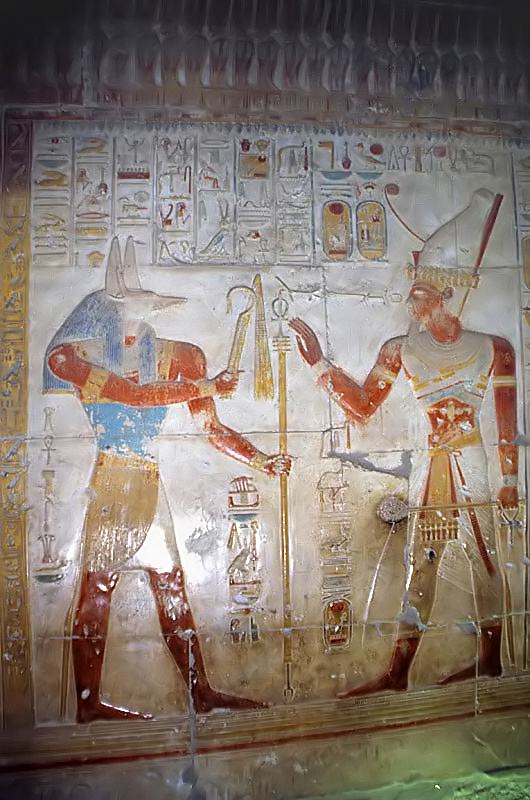
Wepwawet giving scepters to Seti I, bas-relief from the Temple of Seti I. Nearby hieroglyphs and elements which are usually painted black also appear grey.

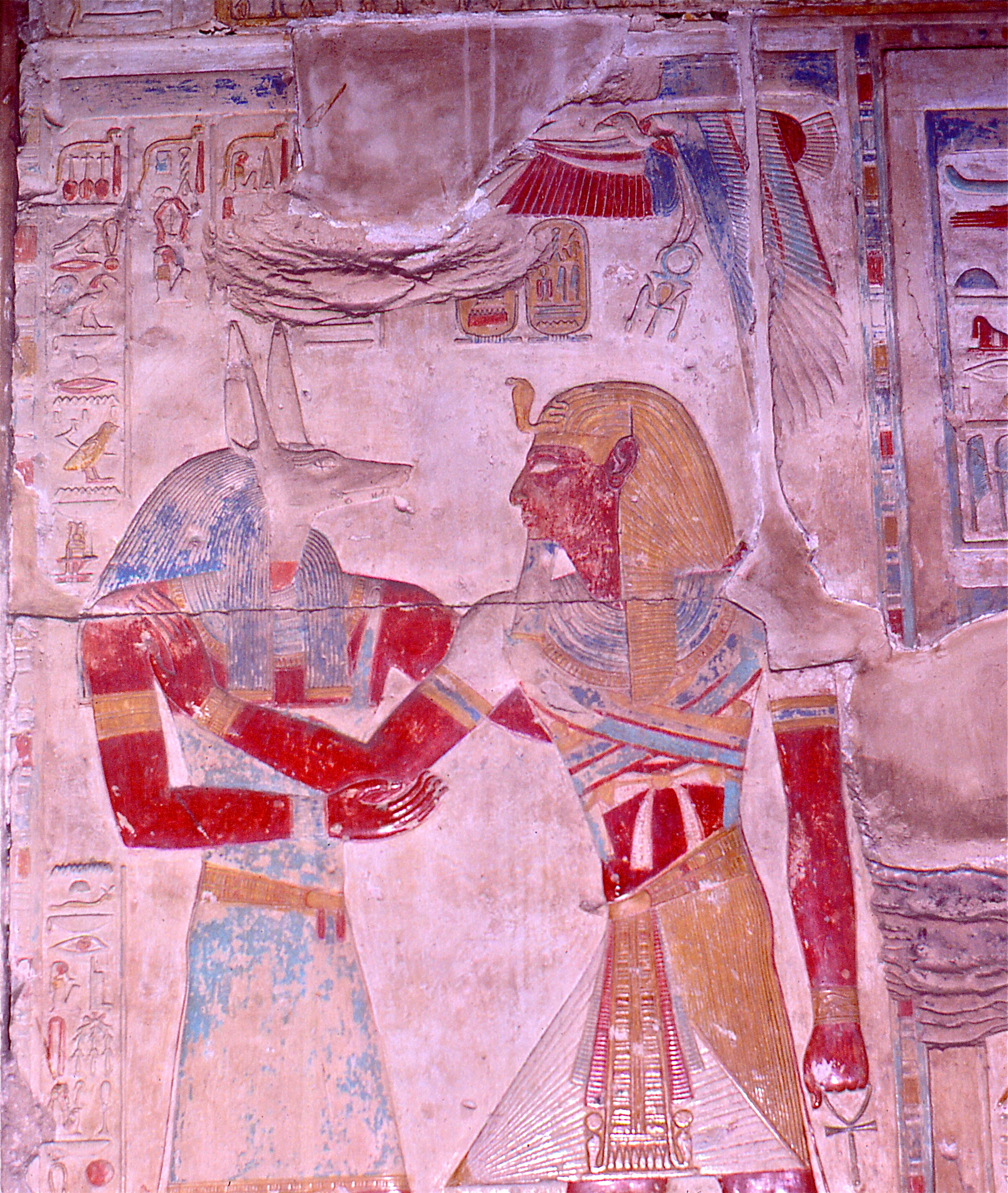
Painted Relief of Seti I embraced by Wepwawet. Nearby hieroglyphs and elements, e.g. the pupils of the eyes, which are usually painted black, also appear grey or white.

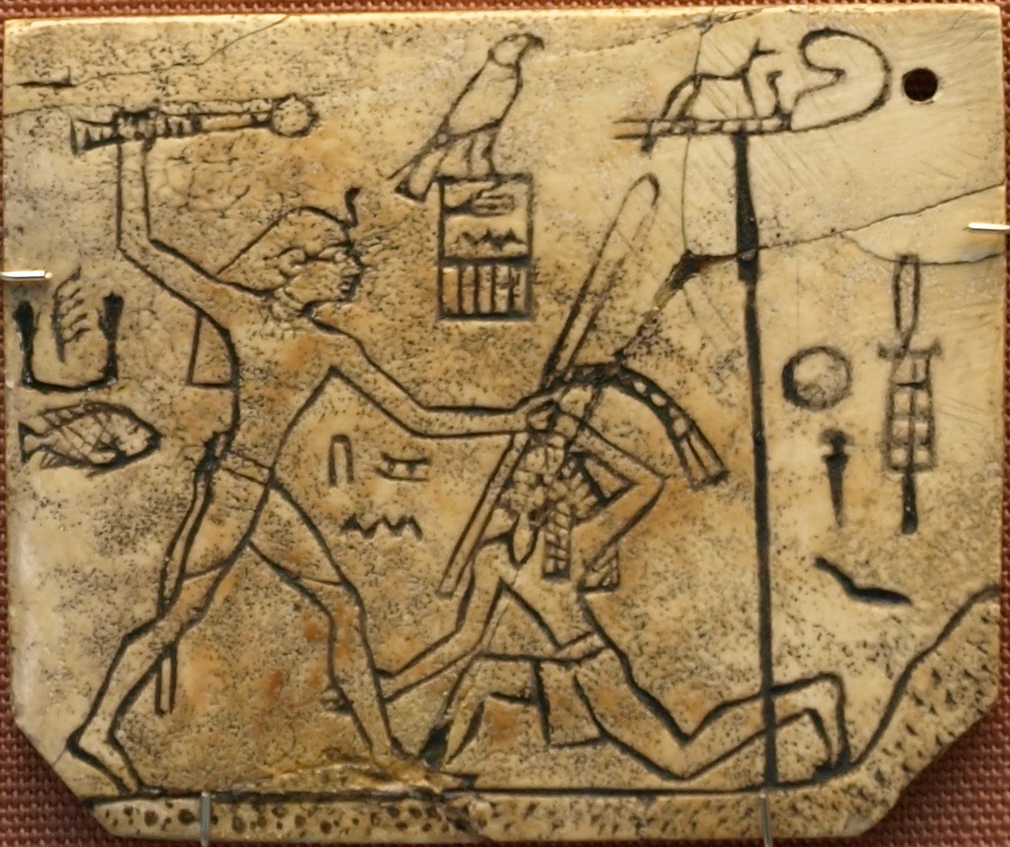
Ivory label depicting the pharaoh Den, found at his tomb in Abydos, c. 3000 BCE. Wepwawet is at the upper right atop a standard.

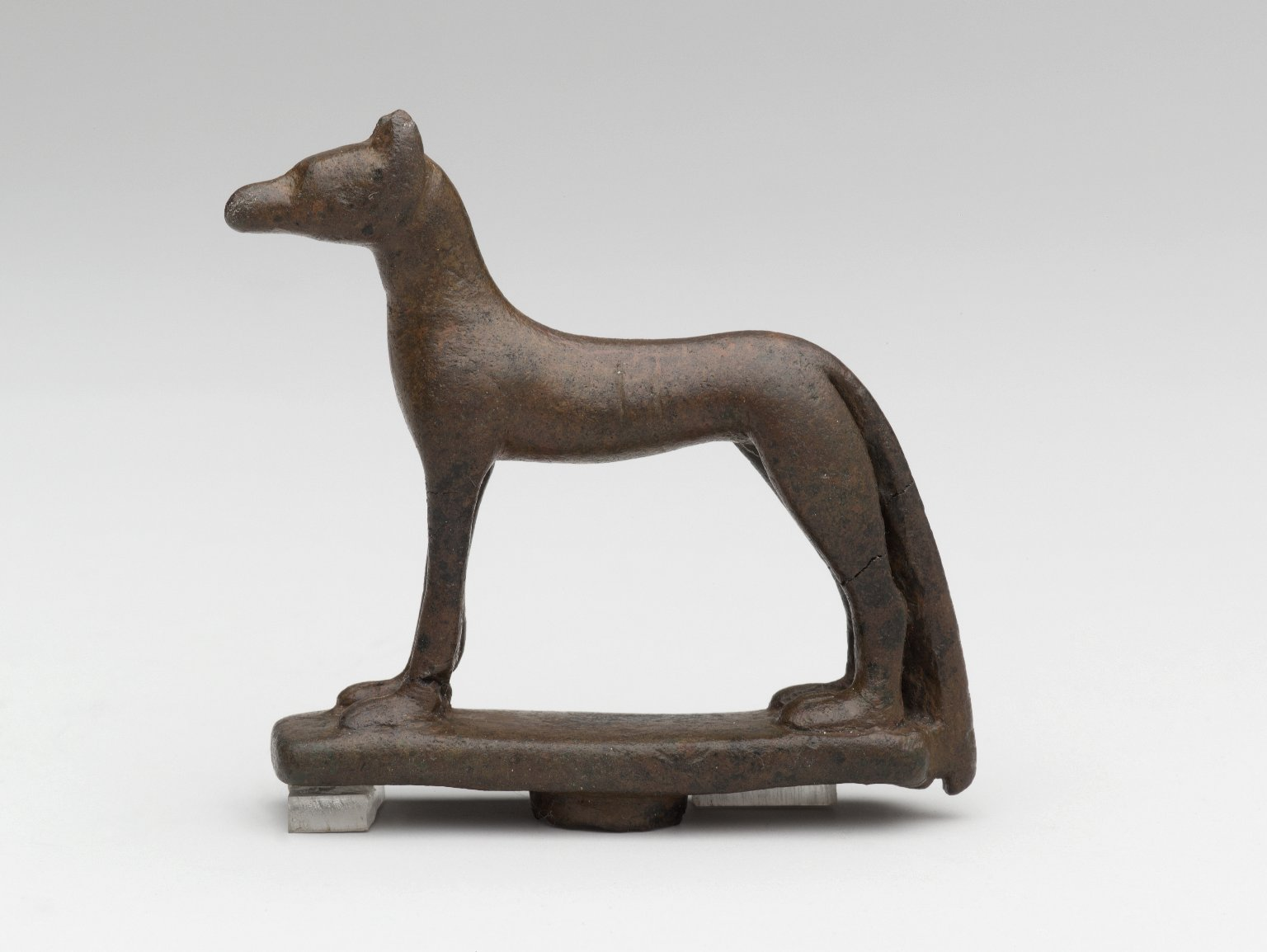
Figure depicting Wepwawet, 664–332 BCE, Brooklyn Museum

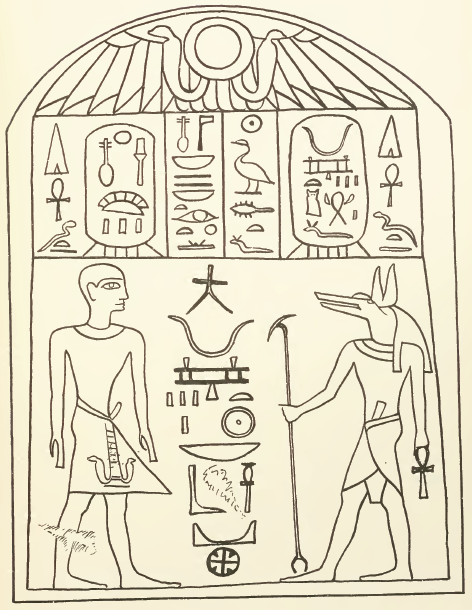
Sketch of a stela depicting pharaoh Wepwawetemsaf standing before Wepwawet, c. 17th century BCE.

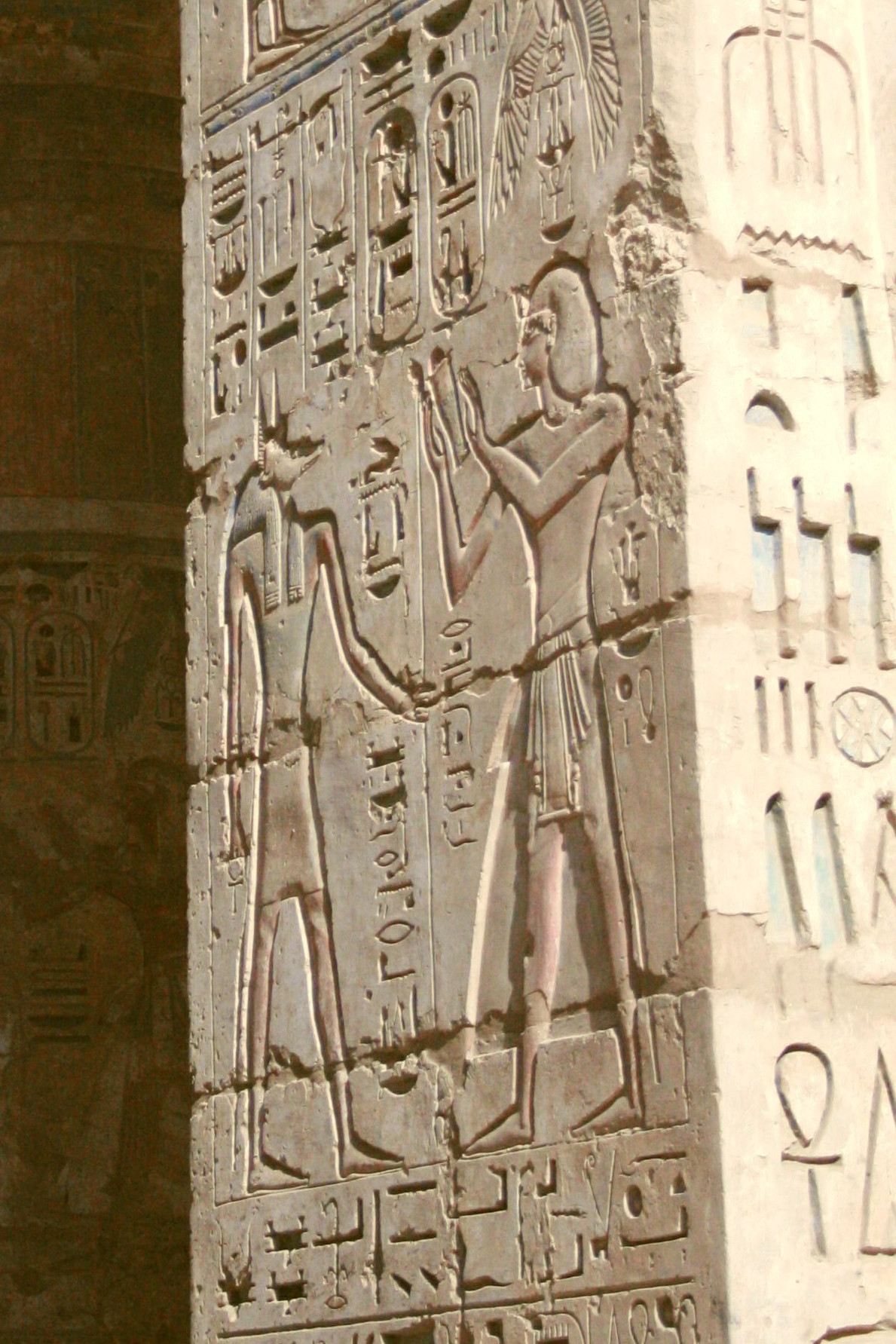
Ramesses III before Wepwawet in a relief from Medinet Habu, c.

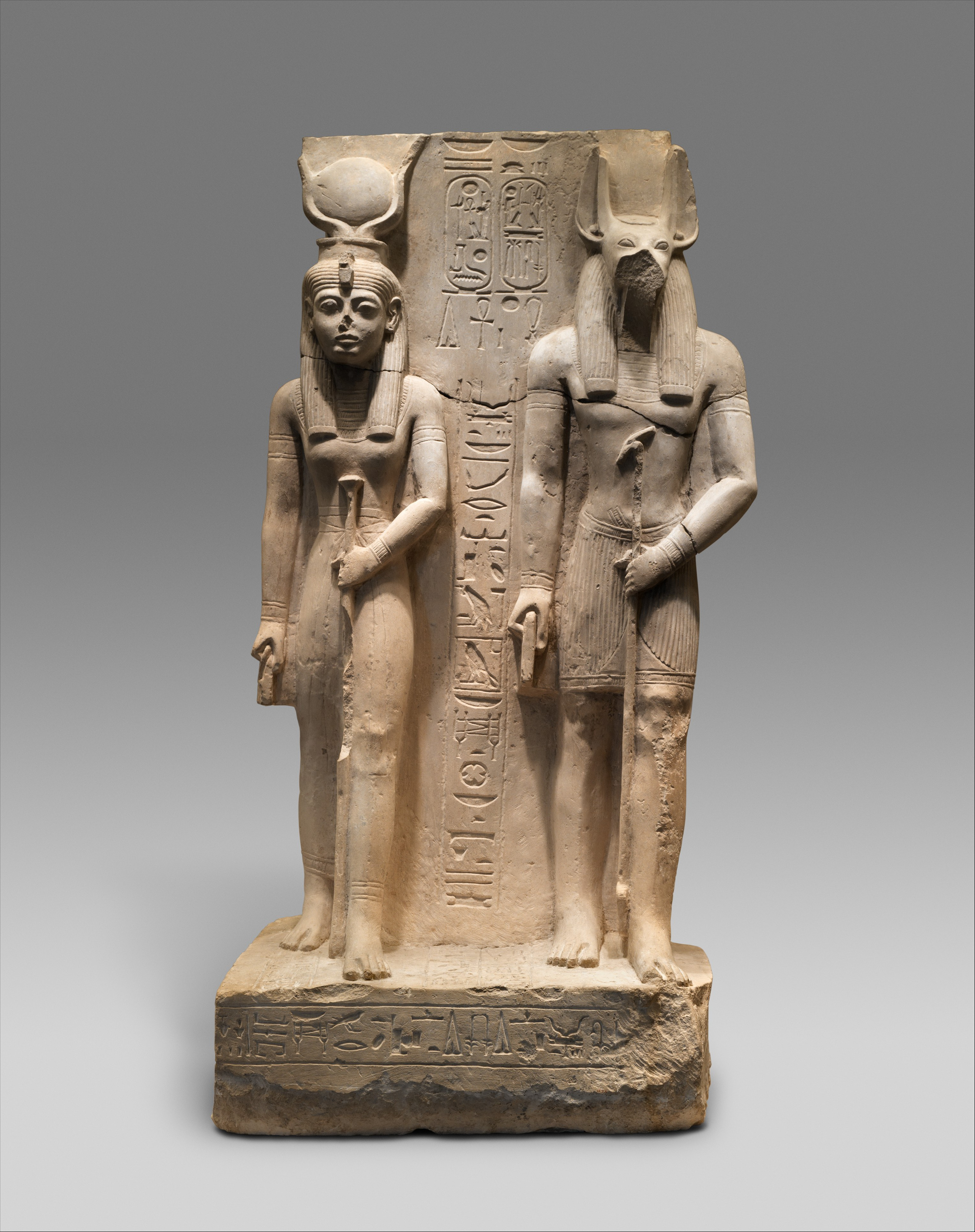
A statue of Wepwawet with the goddess Isis-Hathor, which belonged to an official named Siese who worked under Ramesses II

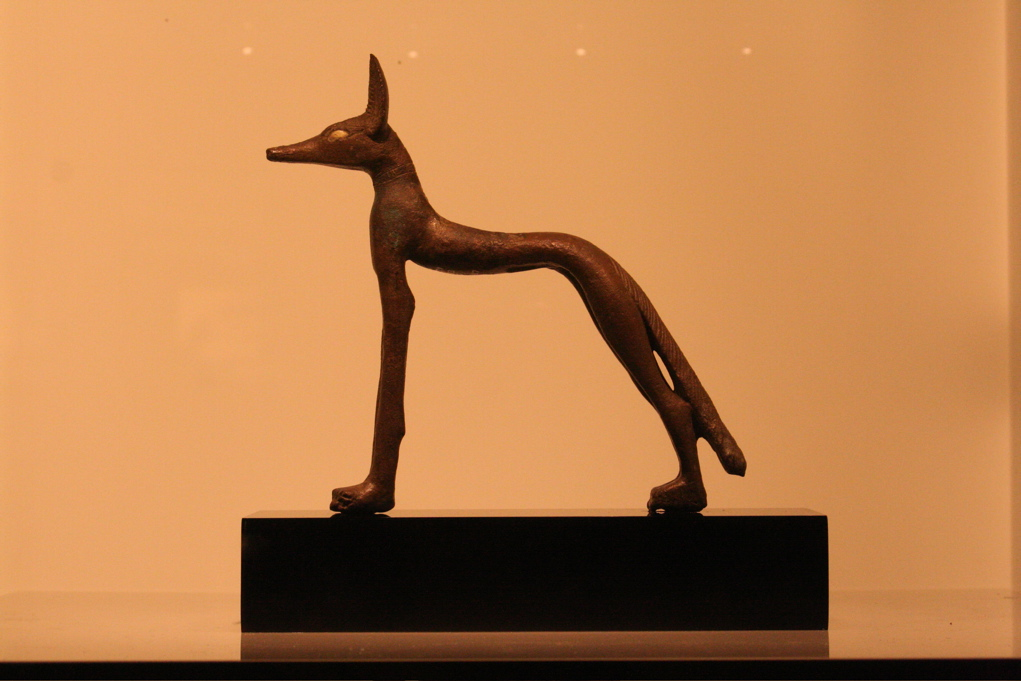
A figure of Wepwawet, British Museum

== See also ==
- Ancient Egyptian afterlife beliefs
- List of wolves
