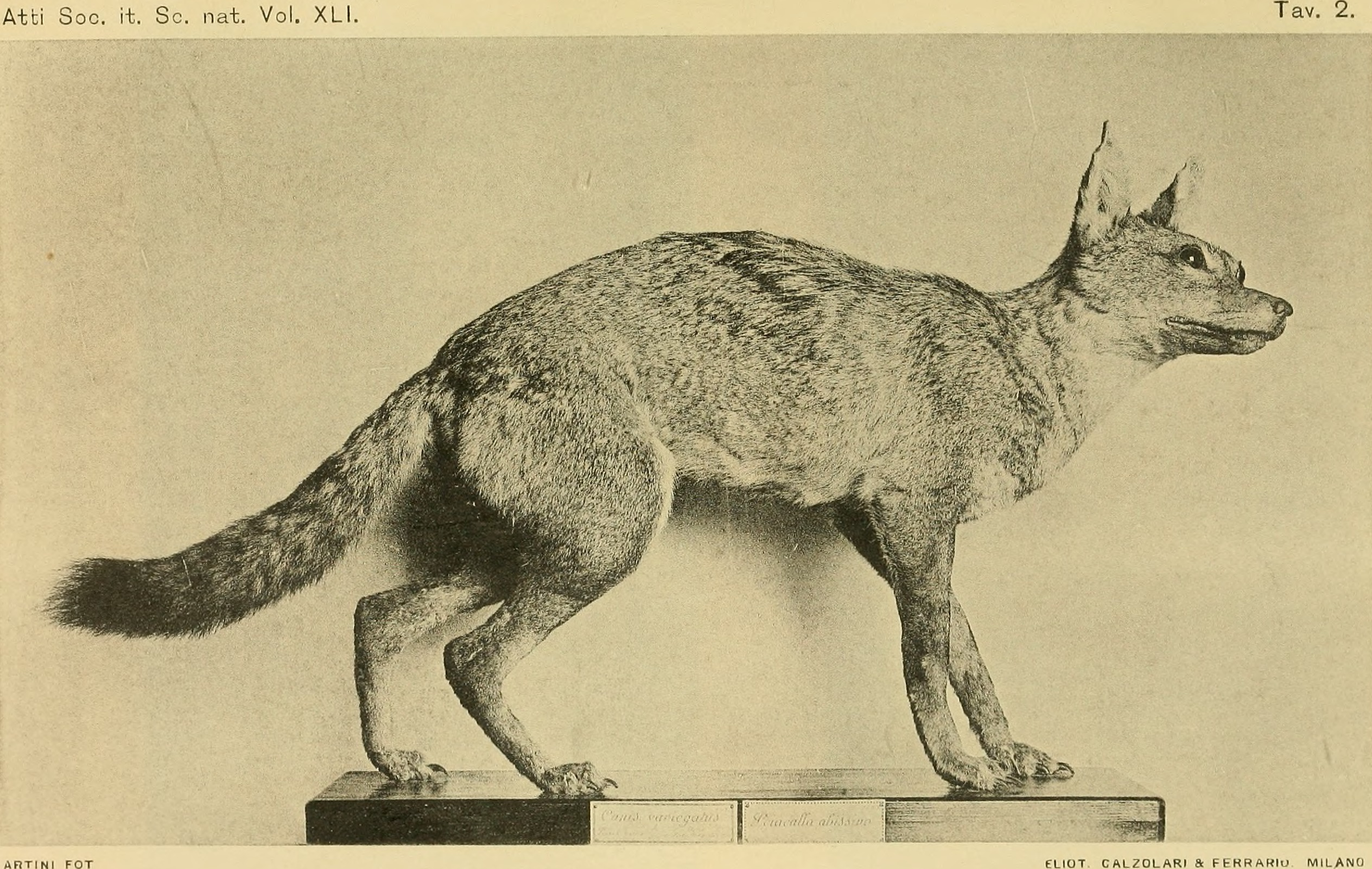

Scientific classification
- Kingdom: Animalia
- Phylum: Chordata
- Class: Mammalia
- Order: Carnivora
- Family: Canidae
- Genus: Canis
- Species: C. lupaster
- Subspecies: C. l. soudanicus

Trinomial name
- Canis lupaster soudanicus Thomas, 1903

Synonyms
- doederleini (Hilzheimer, 1906) nubianus (Cabrera, 1921) thooides (Hilzheimer, 1906) variegatus (Cretzschmar, 1826)

= Variegated wolf =

Subspecies of carnivore

The variegated wolf (Canis lupaster soudanicus), also known as the Nubian wolf, is a subspecies of the African wolf native to Sudan and Somalia. It is smaller and more lightly built than the Egyptian wolf, standing 38 cm (15 in) at the shoulder, and 102 cm (40 in) in length. The variegated wolf is built more like a greyhound than the wolf-like Egyptian wolf. The ears are somewhat larger than the Egyptian wolf's, and the body colour is generally pale stone-buff, with blotches of black. Its main habitat consists of rocky regions, where it feeds on small mammals and birds. The subspecies have been encountered at elevations of up to 5000 feet in the highlands of Abyssinia.
