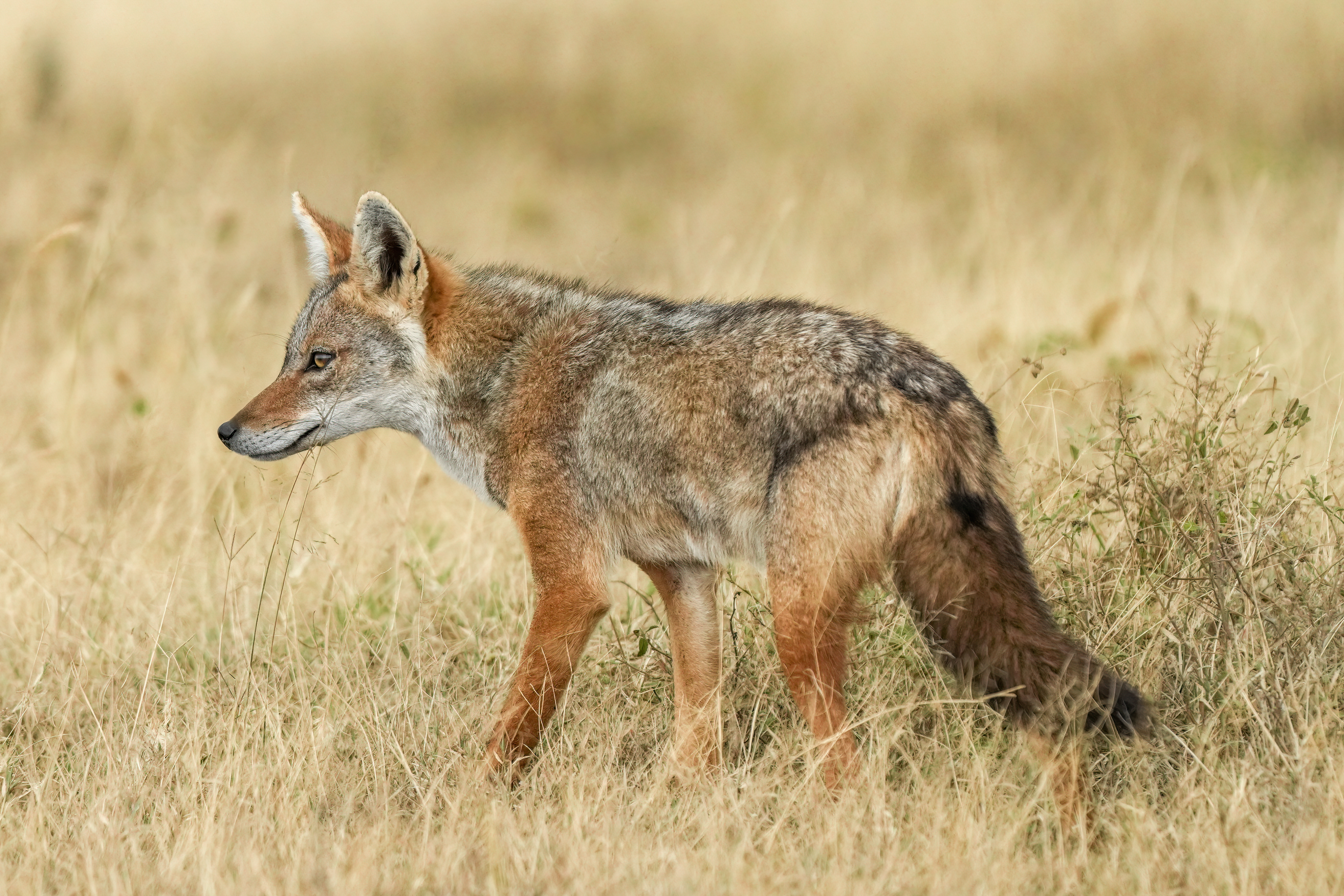
- A wolf at Serengeti National Park, Tanzania

Scientific classification
- Kingdom: Animalia
- Phylum: Chordata
- Class: Mammalia
- Order: Carnivora
- Family: Canidae
- Genus: Canis
- Species: C. lupaster
- Subspecies: C. l. bea

Trinomial name
- Canis lupaster bea (Heller, 1914)

Synonyms
- Thos aureus bea Heller, 1914; Canis aureus bea; Canis anthus bea

= Serengeti wolf =

Subspecies of canine

The Serengeti wolf (Canis lupaster bea), also known as the East African golden wolf, is a subspecies of African wolf native to East Africa.

== Taxonomy ==
Edmund Heller described the Serengeti wolf as a subspecies of the golden jackal in 1914 and distinguished it from other jackals and African wolves by its smaller size and lighter pelt.

== Description ==
It is the smallest subspecies of African wolf, with a body length of 64–85 cm, a shoulder height of 40–42 cm and a weight of 6–10 kg.

The fur is sandy or yellow-brown, with black, brown or white streaks along the back which sometimes form a dark saddle. The throat and abdomen are whitish or pale buff, while the limbs are reddish, with a black stripe being present on the front of the forelegs. The lower part of the tail is black.

Studies on the diet composition of wolves in the Ngorongoro Crater show that insects, particularly dung beetles, are the most commonly consumed food items in both the dry and wet seasons, with plants of the Cucurbitaceae family also being taken. Large herbivore carcasses are most frequently eaten during the dry season, while Abdim's storks, Thomson's gazelle fawns and wildebeest placenta are taken predominantly during the wet season.
