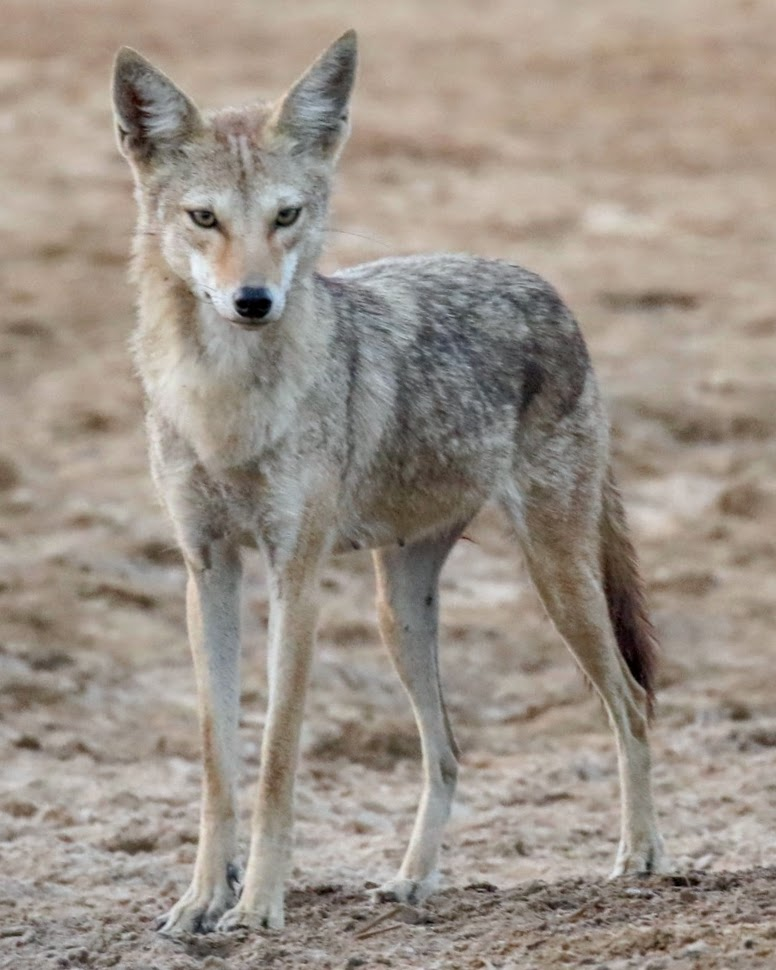
- African wolf in Dagana, Senegal
- African wolves howling

Conservation status
- Least Concern (IUCN 3.1)

Scientific classification
- Kingdom: Animalia
- Phylum: Chordata
- Class: Mammalia
- Order: Carnivora
- Family: Canidae
- Genus: Canis
- Species: C. lupaster

Binomial name
- Canis lupaster Hemprich and Ehrenberg, 1832

Subspecies
- C. l. algirensis; C. l. anthus; C. l. bea; C. l. lupaster; C. l. riparius; C. l. soudanicus
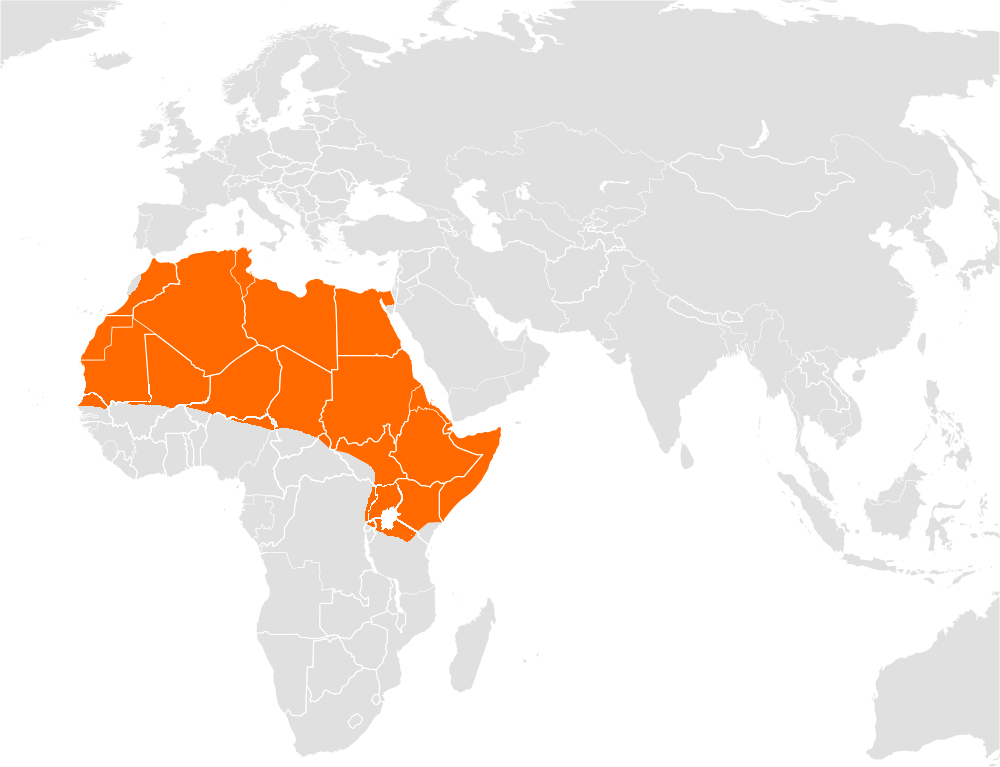

Synonyms
- Canis anthus F. Cuvier, 1820

= African wolf =

African wolf Temporal range: Middle Pleistocene – Recent 0.6-0 Ma

Species of canine native to Africa

The African wolf (Canis lupaster) is a canine native to North Africa, West Africa, the Sahel, northern East Africa, and the Horn of Africa. It is listed as least concern on the IUCN Red List. It is primarily a predator of invertebrates and mammals as large as gazelle fawns, though larger animals are sometimes taken. Its diet also includes animal carcasses, human refuse, and fruit. It is monogamous and territorial; offspring remain with the parents to assist in raising their parents' younger pups.

The African wolf was previously classified as an African variant of the golden jackal, though a series of analyses on the species' mitochondrial DNA and nuclear genome in 2015 demonstrated that it is a distinct species more closely related to the gray wolf and coyote. It is nonetheless still close enough to the golden jackal to produce hybrid offspring, as indicated through genetic tests on jackals in Israel, and a 19th-century captive crossbreeding experiment. Further studies demonstrated that it is the descendant of a genetically admixed canid of 72% gray wolf and 28% Ethiopian wolf ancestry.

It plays a prominent role in some African cultures; it was considered sacred in ancient Egypt, particularly in Lycopolis, where it was venerated as a god. In North African folklore, it is viewed as an untrustworthy animal whose body parts can be used for medicinal or ritualistic purposes, while it is held in high esteem in Senegal's Serer religion as being the first creature to be created by the god Roog.

== Names ==
The taxon is known under the following names: African wolf, African golden wolf, golden wolf, African golden jackal, North African jackal, African jackal, gray jackal, wolf jackal, jackal wolf, Egyptian wolf, Egyptian jackal.

Local and indigenous names:

| Linguistic group or area | Indigenous name |
|---|---|
| Afar | Wucharia |
| Amazigh | Ouchan asian Ouchan akhatar |
| Amharic | ተረ ቀበሮ (Tera kebero) |
| Arabic | ابن آوى (Ibn awa) |
| Fula | 𞤧𞤵𞤲'𞤣𞤵 Sundu |
| Hausa | Kyarkeci |
| Somali | Yey |
| Songhai | Nzongo |
| Swahili (standard); Swahili (Tanzania) | Bweha wa mbuga Bweha dhahabu |
| Tuareg | Ebăgg |
| Tigrinya | ቡኳርያ (bukharya) |
| Wolof | Tili |

== Description ==
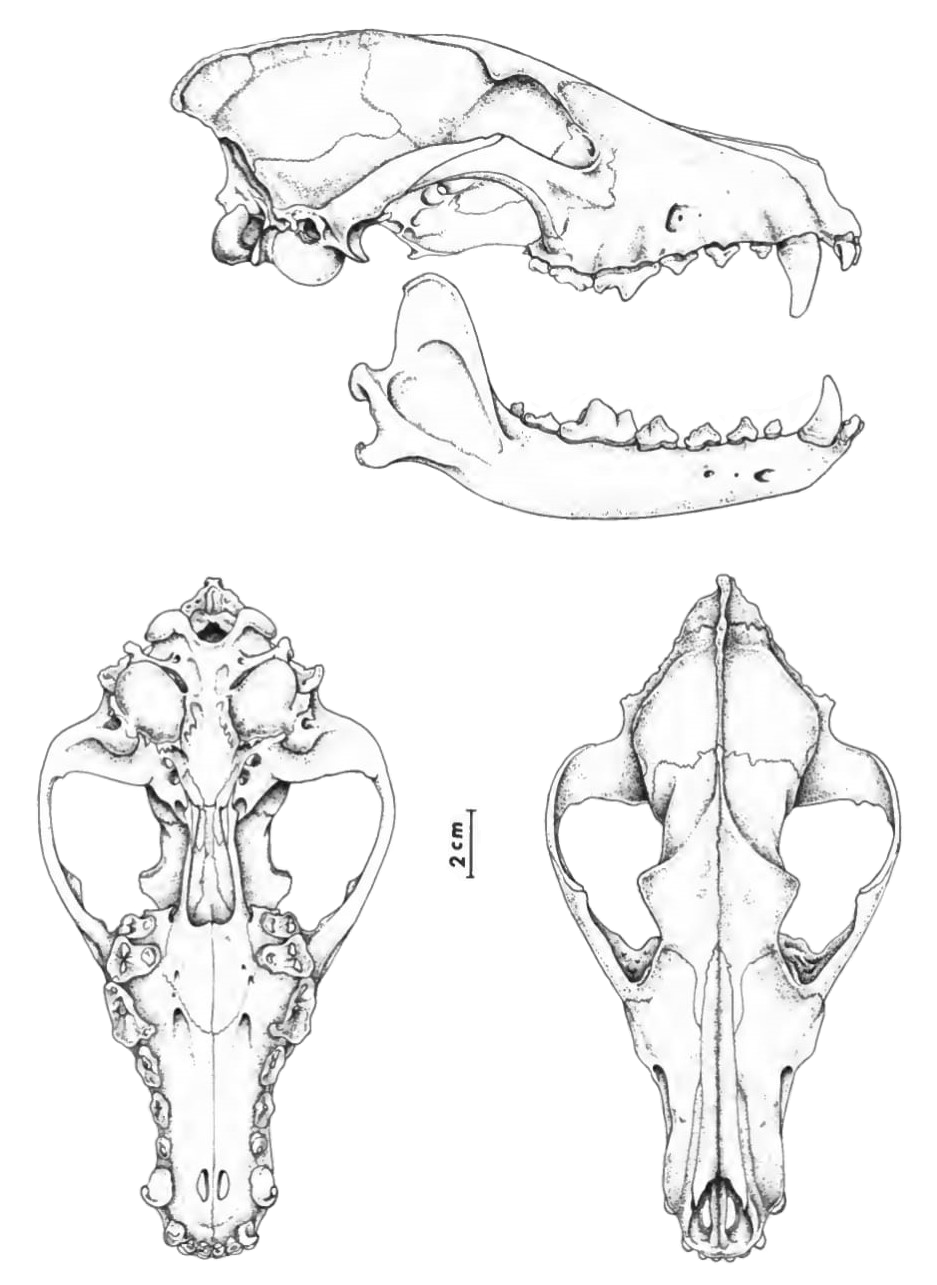
Skull

The African wolf is intermediate in size between the African jackals (L. mesomelas and L. adusta) and the small subspecies of gray wolves, with both sexes weighing 7–15 kg (15–33 lb), and standing 40 cm (16 in) in height. There is however a high degree of size variation geographically, with Western and Northern African specimens being larger than their East African cousins. It has a relatively long snout and ears, while the tail is comparatively short, measuring 20 cm (7.9 in) in length. Fur color varies individually, seasonally and geographically, though the typical coloration is yellowish to silvery grey, with slightly reddish limbs and black speckling on the tail and shoulders. The throat, abdomen and facial markings are usually white, and the eyes are amber-colored. Females bear two to four pairs of teats. Although superficially similar to the golden jackal (particularly in East Africa), the African wolf has a more pointed muzzle and sharper, more robust teeth. The ears are longer in the African wolf, and the skull has a more elevated forehead.

Information on the weights of adults African Wolves.
| Sex and location | Numbers of individuals (n) | Weight (X, kg) | Weight (range, kg) |
|---|---|---|---|
| Males (Ethiopia) | 6 | 9.0 | 7 - 10 |
| Females (Ethiopia) | 4 | 8.1 | 7 - 10 |
| 8 year old melanistic male (Egypt) | 1 | 19 | NA |
| Adults (Egypt) | 21 | 14 | 13 - 19.7 |

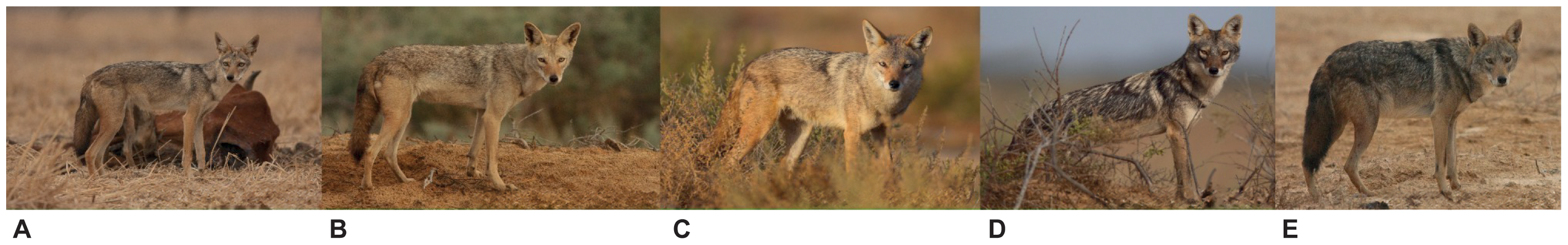
Various C. lupaster phenotypes, ranging from gracile jackal-like morphs to more robust wolf-like ones.

== Taxonomy ==
=== Early writings ===
Aristotle wrote of wolves living in Egypt, mentioning that they were smaller than the Greek kind. Georg Ebers wrote of the wolf being among the sacred animals of Egypt, describing it as a "smaller variety" of wolf to those of Europe, and noting how the name Lykopolis, the Ancient Egyptian city dedicated to Anubis, means "city of the wolf".

The African wolf was first recognised as being a separate species from the golden jackal by Frédéric Cuvier in 1820, who described it as being a more elegant animal, with a more melodic voice and a less strong odour. The binomial name he chose for it was derived from the Arcadian Anthus family described by Pliny the Elder in his Natural History, whose members would draw lots to become werewolves. Eduard Rüppell proposed that it was the ancestor of Egyptian sighthounds, and named it Wolfs-hund (wolf dog). Charles Hamilton Smith named it "thoa" or "thous dog".

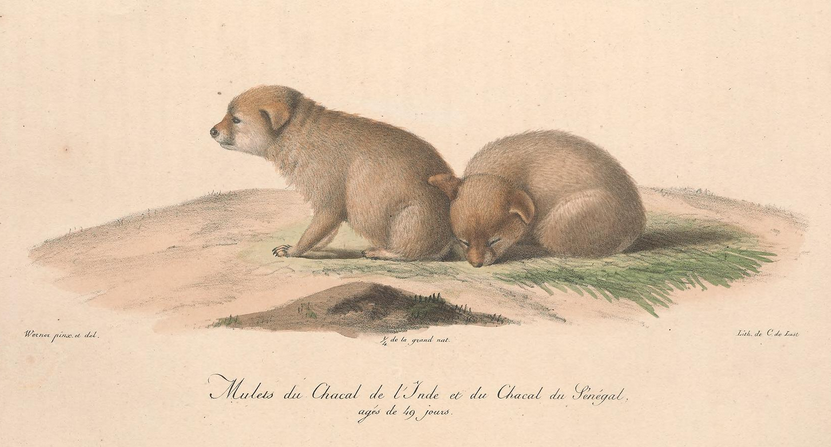
Illustration of golden jackal-African wolf hybrids bred in captivity (1821).

An attempt was also made in 1821 to hybridise the two species in captivity, resulting in the birth of five pups, three of which died before weaning. The two survivors were noted to never play with each other, and had completely contrasting temperaments: One pup inherited the golden jackal's shyness, while the other was affectionate toward its human captors. St. George Jackson Mivart emphasized the differences between the African wolf and the golden jackal in his writings:

... it is a nice question whether the Common Jackal of North Africa should or should not be regarded as of the same species [as the golden jackal] ... Certainly the differences of coloration which exist between these forms are not nearly so great as those which are to be found to occur between the different local varieties of C. lupus. We are nevertheless inclined ... to keep the North-African and Indian Jackals distinct ... The reason why we prefer to keep them provisionally distinct is that though the difference between the two forms (African and Indian) is slight as regards coloration, yet it appears to be a very constant one. Out of seventeen skins of the Indian form, we have only found one which is wanting in the main characteristic as to difference of hue. The ears also are relatively shorter than in the North-African form. But there is another character to which we attach greater weight. However much the different races of Wolves differ in size, we have not succeeded in finding any constant distinctive characters in the form of the skull or the proportions of the lobes of any of the teeth. So far as we have been able to observe, such differences do exist between the Indian and North-African Jackals.

— Mivart (1890)

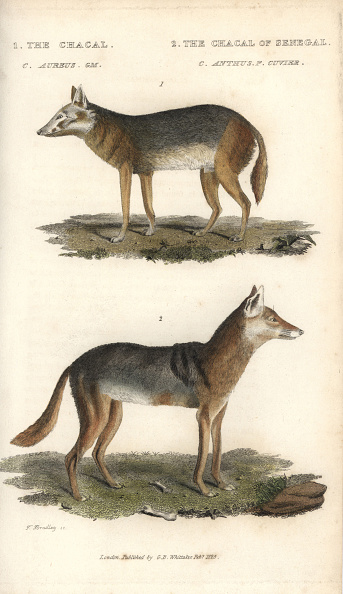
Comparative illustration of C. aureus (top) and C. lupaster (bottom).

The canids present in Egypt in particular were noted to be so much more gray wolf-like than populations elsewhere in Africa that Hemprich and Ehrenberg gave them the binomial name Canis lupaster in 1832. Likewise, Thomas Henry Huxley, upon noting the similarities between the skulls of lupaster and Indian wolves, classed the animal as a subspecies of the gray wolf. However, the animal was subsequently synonymised with the golden jackal by Ernst Schwarz in 1926.

In 1965, the Finnish paleontologist Björn Kurtén wrote:

The taxonomy of the Jackals in the Near East is still a matter of dispute. On the basis of skeletal material, however, it can be stated that the Wolf Jackal is specifically distinct from the much smaller Golden Jackal.

In 1981, zoologist Walter Ferguson argued in favor of lupaster being a subspecies of the gray wolf based on cranial measurements, stating that the classing of the animal as a jackal was based solely on the animal's small size, and predated the discovery of C. l. arabs, which is intermediate in size between C. l. lupus and lupaster.

=== 21st-century discoveries ===
Phylogenetic tree of the wolf-like canids with timing in millions of years (Note: For a full set of supporting references refer to the note (a) in the phylotree at Evolution of the wolf#Wolf-like canids)

- Caninae 3.5 Ma
  - 3.0
    - 2.5
      - 2.0
        - 0.96
          - 0.6
            - 0.38
              - - - Domestic dog
                  - Gray wolf
              - Coyote
            - 0.11
              - African wolf: northwestern Africa
              - African wolf: eastern Africa
          - Golden jackal
        - Ethiopian wolf
      - Dhole
    - African wild dog
  - - 2.6
      - Side-striped jackal
      - Black-backed jackal

Further doubts over its being conspecific with the golden jackal of Eurasia arose in December 2002, when a canid was sighted in Eritrea's Danakil Desert whose appearance did not correspond to that of the golden jackal or the six other recognized species of the area, but strongly resembled that of the gray wolf. The area had previously been largely unexplored because of its harsh climate and embroilment in the Eritrean War of Independence and subsequent Eritrean–Ethiopian War, though local Afar tribesmen knew of the animal, and referred to it as wucharia (wolf).

The animal's wolf-like qualities were confirmed in 2011, when several golden "jackal" populations in Egypt and the Horn of Africa classed as Canis aureus lupaster were found to have mtDNA sequences more closely resembling those found in gray wolves than those of golden jackals. These wolf-like mtDNA sequences were found to occur over a 6,000 km wide area, encompassing Algeria, Mali and Senegal. Furthermore, the sampled African specimens displayed much more nucleotide and haplotype diversity than that present in Indian and Himalayan wolves, thus indicating a larger ancestral population, and an effective extant population of around 80,000 females. Both these studies proposed reclassifying Canis aureus lupaster as a subspecies of the gray wolf.

In 2015, a more thorough comparative study of mitochondrial and nuclear genomes on a larger sample of wolf-like African canids from northern, eastern and western Africa showed that they were in fact all distinct from the golden jackal, with a genetic divergence of around 6.7%, which is greater than that between gray wolves and coyotes (4%) and that between gray wolves and domestic dogs (0.2%). Furthermore, the study showed that these African wolf-like canids (renamed Canis lupaster, or African wolves) were more closely related to gray wolves and coyotes than to golden jackals, and that C. l. lupaster merely represents a distinct phenotype of the African wolf rather than an actual gray wolf.

It was estimated that the African wolf diverged from the wolf–coyote clade 1.0–1.7 million years ago, during the Pleistocene, and therefore its superficial similarity to the golden jackal (particularly in East Africa, where African wolves are similar in size to golden jackals) would be a case of parallel evolution. Considering its phylogenetic position and the canid fossil record, it is likely that the African wolf evolved from larger ancestors that became progressively more jackal-like in size upon populating Africa on account of interspecific competition with both larger and smaller indigenous carnivores. Traces of African wolf DNA were identified in golden jackals in Israel, which adjoins Egypt, thus indicating the presence of a hybrid zone. The study's findings were corroborated that same year by Spanish, Mexican and Moroccan scientists analyzing the mtDNA of wolves in Morocco, who found that the specimens analyzed were distinct from both golden jackals and gray wolves but bore a closer relationship to the latter. Studies on RAD sequences found instances of African wolves hybridizing with both feral dogs and Ethiopian wolves.

In 2017, it was proposed by scientists at the Oslo and Helsinki Universities that the binomial name C. anthus was a nomen dubium, as Cuvier's 1820 description of the holotype, a female collected from Senegal, seems to be describing the side-striped jackal rather than the actual African wolf, and does not match the appearance of a male specimen described by Cuvier in his later writings. This ambiguity, coupled with the disappearance of the holotype's remains, led to the scientists proposing giving priority to Hemprich and Ehrenberg's name C. lupaster, due to the type specimen having a more detailed and consistent description, and its remains being still examinable at the Museum für Naturkunde. The following year, a major genetic study of Canis species also referred to the African wolf as Canis lupaster.

In 2019, a workshop hosted by the IUCN/SSC Canid Specialist Group recommended that because the specimen identified as Canis anthus Cuvier, 1820 was uncertain, the species should be known as Canis lupaster Hemprich and Ehrenberg, 1832 until Canis anthus can be validated.

A plausible candidate for the holotype of the African wolf was found in the Muséum National d’Histoire Naturelle, a mounted skin with the label “C. anthus (F. Cuv.) M. Ferdinand Sénégal” registered in 1826.

=== Admixture with other Canis species ===
In 2018, whole genome sequencing was used to compare members of the genus Canis. The study supports the African wolf being distinct from the golden jackal, and with the Ethiopian wolf being genetically basal to both. Two genetically distinct African wolf populations exist in northwestern and eastern Africa. This suggests that Ethiopian wolves – or a close and extinct relative – once had a much larger range within Africa to admix with other canids. There is evidence of gene flow between the eastern population and the Ethiopian wolf, which has led to the eastern population being distinct from the northwestern population. The common ancestor of both African wolf populations was a genetically admixed canid of 72% gray wolf and 28% Ethiopian wolf ancestry. There is evidence of gene flow between African wolves, golden jackals, and gray wolves. One African wolf from the Egyptian Sinai Peninsula showed high admixture with the Middle Eastern gray wolves and dogs, highlighting the role of the land bridge between the African and other continents in canid evolution. African wolves form a sister clade to Middle Eastern gray wolves based on mitochondrial DNA, but to coyotes and gray wolves based on nuclear DNA.

=== Relationship to the Himalayan wolf ===
Between 2011 and 2015, two mtDNA studies found that the Himalayan wolf and Indian wolf were closer to the African wolf than they were to the Holarctic gray wolf. In 2017, a study of mitochondrial DNA, X-chromosome (maternal lineage) markers and Y-chromosome (male lineage) markers found that the Himalayan wolf is genetically basal to the Holarctic gray wolf. The Himalayan wolf shares a maternal lineage with the African wolf, and possesses a unique paternal lineage that falls between the gray wolf and the African wolf.

=== Subspecies ===
Although in the past several attempts have been made to synonymise many of the proposed names, the taxonomic position of West African wolves, in particular, is too confused to come to any precise conclusion, as the collected study materials are few. Prior to 1840, six of the 10 supposed West African subspecies were named or classed almost entirely because of their fur color.

The species' display of high individual variation, coupled with the scarcity of samples and the lack of physical barriers on the continent preventing gene flow, brings into question the validity of some of the West African forms. However, a study showed that the genetic divergence of all of the African wolves occurred between 50,000 and 10,500 years ago, with most occurring between 30,000 and 16,000 years ago during the Late Glacial Maximum (33,000–16,000 years ago). There were very dry conditions across the Sahara during this period. The study proposes that these wolves were isolated in refugia and therefore isolated for hundreds of generations, leading to genetic divergence.

| Subspecies | Trinomial authority | Trinomial authority (year) | Description | Range | Synonyms |
|---|---|---|---|---|---|
| Algerian wolf C. l. algirensis | Wagner | 1841 | A dark-colored subspecies, with a tail marked with three dusky rings. It is similar in size to the red fox. | Algeria, Morocco and Tunisia | barbarus (C. E. H. Smith, 1839) grayi (Hilzheimer, 1906) tripolitanus (Wagner, 1841) |
| Senegalese wolf C. l. anthus | F. Cuvier | 1820 | Similar to lupaster, but smaller and more lightly built, with paler fur and a sharper muzzle. | Senegal | senegalensis (C. E. H. Smith, 1839) |
| Serengeti wolf C. l. bea | Heller | 1914 | Smaller and lighter-colored than the northern forms. | Kenya, northern Tanzania | |
| Egyptian wolf C. l. lupaster | Hemprich and Ehrenberg | 1833 | A large, stoutly built subspecies with proportionately short ears and presenting a very gray wolf-like phenotype, standing 40.6 cm (16.0 in) in shoulder height and 127 cm (50 in) in body length. The upper parts are yellowish-gray tinged with black, while the muzzle, the ears and the outer surfaces of the limbs are reddish-yellow. The fur around the mouth is white. | Egypt, Algeria, Mali, Ethiopian Highlands, and Senegal | C. aureus lupaster C. lupus lupaster C. lupaster C. sacer (Hemprich and Ehrenberg, 1833) |
| Somali wolf C. l. riparius | Hemprich and Ehrenberg | 1832 | A dwarf subspecies measuring only 12 inches in shoulder height, it is generally of a grayish-yellow color, mingled with only a small proportion of black. The muzzle and legs are more decidedly yellow, and the underparts are white. | Somalia and the coast of Ethiopia and Eritrea | hagenbecki (Noack, 1897) mengesi (Noack, 1897) somalicus (Lorenz, 1906) |
| Variegated wolf or Nubian wolf C. l. soudanicus | Thomas | 1903 | A small subspecies standing 38 cm (15 in) at the shoulder, and measuring 102 cm (40 in) in length. The fur is generally pale stone-buff, with blotches of black. | Sudan and Somalia | doederleini (Hilzheimer, 1906) nubianus (Cabrera, 1921) thooides (Hilzheimer, 1906) variegatus (Cretzschmar, 1826) |

== Distribution and habitat ==
The African wolf has a wide range across northern Africa, occurring in Senegal, Burkina Faso, Cameroon, the Central African Republic, Djibouti, Eritrea, Ethiopia, Guinea, Mali, Mauritania, Niger, Somalia, South Sudan, Sudan, Western Sahara, Nigeria, Chad, Morocco, Algeria, Tunisia, Libya, Kenya, Egypt, and Tanzania. Fossil finds dating back to the Pleistocene indicate that the species' range was not always restricted to Africa, with remains having been found in the Levant and Saudi Arabia.

The African wolf inhabits a number of different habitats; in Algeria it lives in Mediterranean, coastal and hilly areas including hedged farmlands, scrublands, pinewoods and oak forests, while in Senegal it inhabits tropical, semi-arid climate zones including Sahelian savannahs. Wolf populations in Mali have been documented in arid Sahelian massifs. In Egypt, the African wolf inhabits agricultural areas, wastelands, desert margins, rocky areas, and cliffs. At Lake Nasser, it lives close to the lakeshore. In Morocco, it has been documented in the central Atlas Mountains. It apparently does well in areas with a high human population density and low natural prey populations, as in the Enderta district of northern Ethiopia. This wolf has been reported in the very dry Danakil Depression desert on the coast of Eritrea.

== Behaviour and ecology ==
=== Social and reproductive behaviors ===
The African wolf's social organisation is extremely flexible, varying according to the availability and distribution of food. The basic social unit is a breeding pair, followed by its current offspring, or offspring from previous litters staying as "helpers". Large groups are rare, and have only been recorded to occur in areas with abundant human waste. Family relationships among African wolves are comparatively peaceful in relation to those of the black-backed jackal; although the sexual and territorial behavior of grown pups is suppressed by the breeding pair, they are not actively driven off once they attain adulthood. African wolves also lie together and groom each other much more frequently than black-backed jackals. In the Serengeti, pairs defend permanent territories encompassing 2–4 km^{2}, and will vacate their territories only to drink or when lured by a large carcass. The pair patrols and marks its territory in tandem. Both partners and helpers will react aggressively towards intruders, though the greatest aggression is reserved for intruders of the same sex; pair members do not assist each other in repelling intruders of the opposite sex.

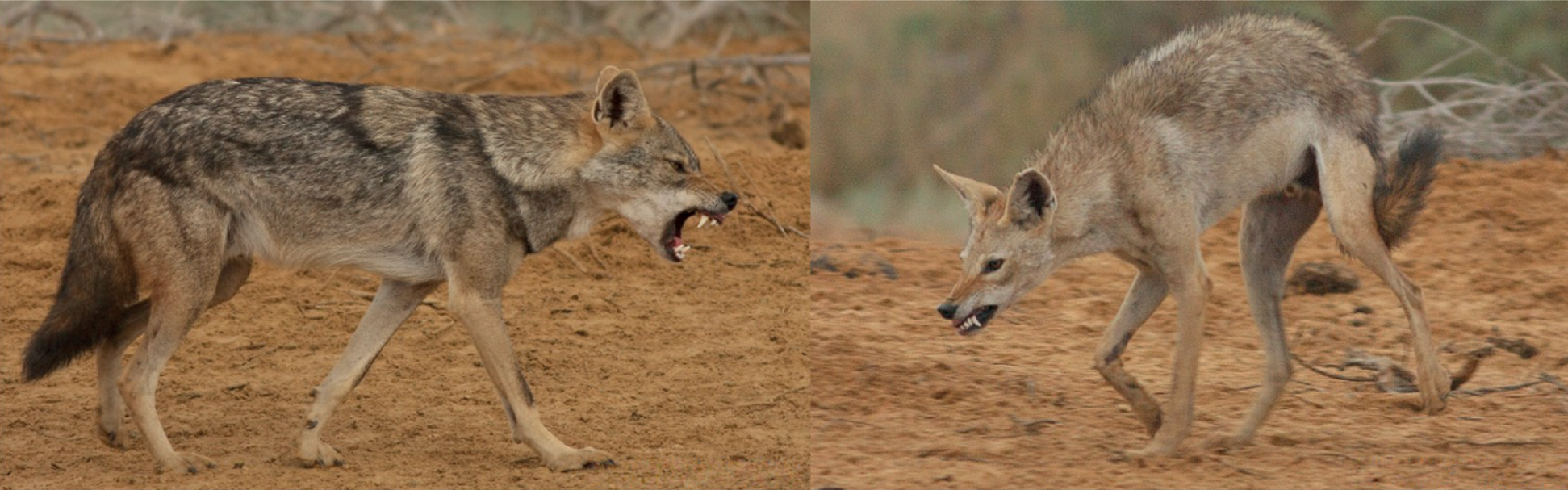
Threat postures in C. l. lupaster (left) and C. l. anthus (right)

The African wolf's courtship rituals are remarkably long, during which the breeding pair remains almost constantly together. Prior to mating, the pair patrols and scent marks its territory. Copulation is preceded by the female holding her tail out and angled in such a way that her genitalia are exposed. The two approach each other, whimpering, lifting their tails and bristling their fur, displaying varying intensities of offensive and defensive behavior. The female sniffs and licks the male's genitals, whilst the male nuzzles the female's fur. They may circle each other and fight briefly. The copulatory tie lasts roughly four minutes. Towards the end of estrus, the pair drifts apart, with the female often approaching the male in a comparatively more submissive manner. In anticipation of the role he will take in raising pups, the male regurgitates or surrenders any food he has to the female. In the Serengeti, pups are born in December–January, and begin eating solid food after a month. Weaning starts at the age of two months, and ends at four months. At this stage, the pups are semi-independent, venturing up to 50 meters from the den, even sleeping in the open. Their playing behavior becomes increasingly more aggressive, with the pups competing for rank, which is established after six months. The female feeds the pups more frequently than the male or helpers do, though the presence of the latter allows the breeding pair to leave the den and hunt without leaving the litter unprotected.

The African wolf's life centers around a home burrow, which usually consists of an abandoned and modified aardvark or warthog earth. The interior structure of this burrow is poorly understood, though it is thought to consist of a single central chamber with 2–3 escape routes. The home burrow can be located in both secluded areas or surprisingly near the dens of other predators.

=== Communication ===
African wolves frequently groom one another, particularly during courtship, during which it can last up to 30 minutes. Nibbling of the face and neck is observed during greeting ceremonies. When fighting, the African wolf slams its opponents with its hips, and bites and shakes the shoulder. The species' postures are typically canine, and it has more facial mobility than the black-backed and side-striped jackals, being able to expose its canine teeth like a dog.

The vocalisations of the African wolf are similar to those of the domestic dog, with seven sounds having been recorded, including howls, barks, growls, whines and cackles. Subspecies can be recognised by differences in their howls. One of the most commonly heard sounds is a high, keening wail, of which there are three varieties; a long single toned continuous howl, a wail that rises and falls, and a series of short, staccato howls. These howls are used to repel intruders and attract family members. Howling in chorus is thought to reinforce family bonds and establish territorial status. A comparative analysis of African wolf and some gray wolf subspecies' howls demonstrated that the former's howls bear similarities to those of the Indian wolf, being high-pitched and of relatively short duration.

=== Hunting and diet ===
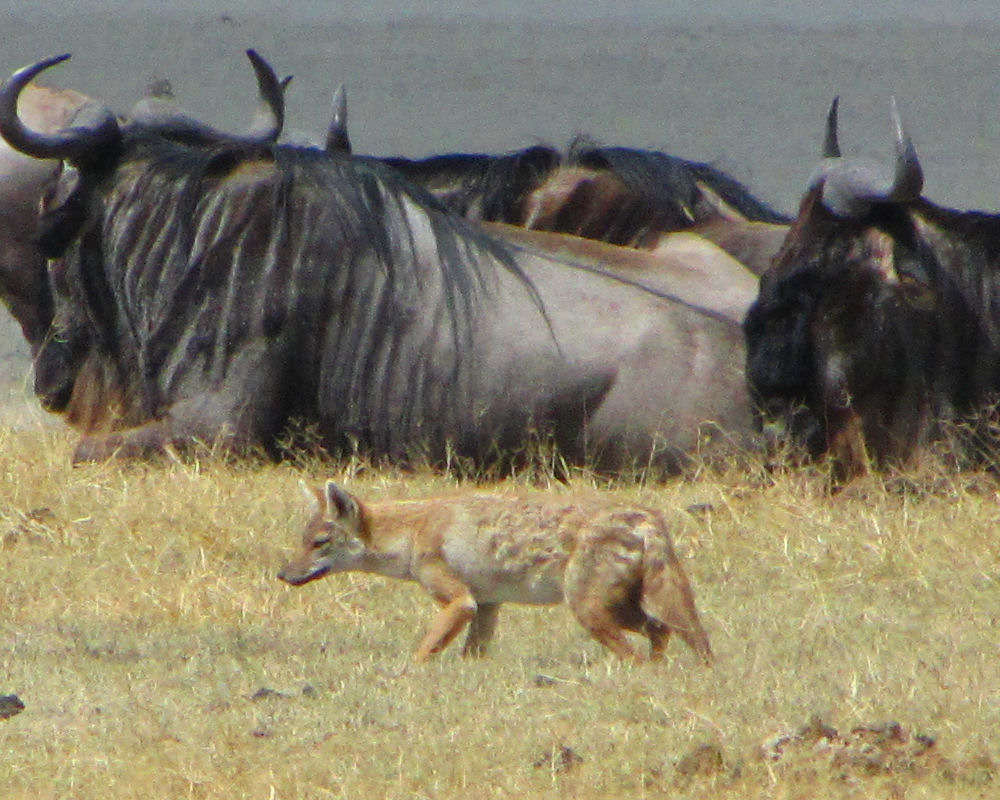
A Serengeti wolf (C. l. bea) navigating through a herd of blue wildebeest in the Ngorongoro National Park, Tanzania

The African wolf rarely catches hares, due to their speed. Gazelle mothers (often working in groups of two or three) are formidable when defending their young against single wolves, which are much more successful in hunting gazelle fawns when working in pairs. A pair of wolves will methodically search for concealed gazelle fawns within herds, tall grass, bushes and other likely hiding places.

Although it is known to kill animals up to three times its own weight, the African wolf targets mammalian prey much less frequently than the black-backed jackal overall. On capturing large prey, the African wolf makes no attempt to kill it; instead it rips open the belly and eats the entrails. Small prey is typically killed by shaking, though snakes may be eaten alive from the tail end. The African wolf often carries away more food than it can consume, and caches the surplus, which is generally recovered within 24 hours. When foraging for insects, the African wolf turns over dung piles to find dung beetles. During the dry seasons, it excavates dung balls to reach the larvae inside. Grasshoppers and flying termites are caught either in mid-air or by pouncing on them while they are on the ground. It is fiercely intolerant of other scavengers, having been known to dominate vultures on kills – one can hold dozens of vultures at bay by threatening, snapping and lunging at them.

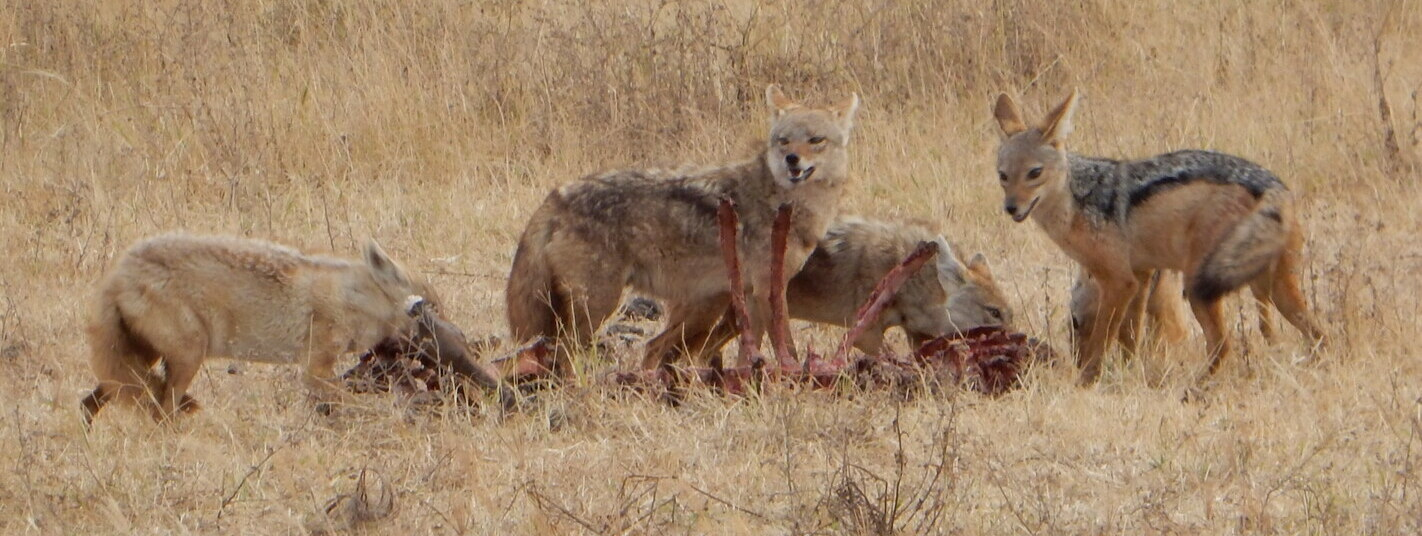
African wolves feeding on a carcass alongside a black-backed jackal

In West Africa, the African wolf mostly confines itself to small prey, such as hares, rats, ground squirrels and cane rats. Other prey items include lizards, snakes, and ground-nesting birds, such as francolins and bustards. It also consumes a large amount of insects, including dung beetles, larvae, termites and grasshoppers. It will also kill young gazelles, duikers and warthogs. In East Africa, it consumes invertebrates and fruit, though 60% of its diet consists of rodents, lizards, snakes, birds, hares and Thomson's gazelles. During the wildebeest calving season, African wolves will feed almost exclusively on their afterbirth. In the Serengeti and Ngorongoro Crater, less than 20% of its diet comes from scavenging. In Senegal, where both C. l. anthus and C. l. lupaster coexist, some degree of niche segregation is apparent in their choice of prey; the former is reputed to feed primarily on lambs, whereas the latter attacks larger prey, such as sheep, goats and cattle.

=== Enemies and competitors ===
The African wolf generally manages to avoid competing with black-backed and side-striped jackals by occupying a different habitat (grassland, as opposed to the closed and open woodlands favored by the latter two species) and being more active during the daytime. Nevertheless, the African wolf has been known to kill the pups of black-backed jackals, but has in turn been observed to be dominated by adults during disputes over carcasses. It often eats alongside African wild dogs, and will stand its ground if the dogs try to harass it. Encounters with Ethiopian wolves are usually antagonistic, with Ethiopian wolves dominating African wolves if the latter enter their territories, and vice versa. Although African wolves are inefficient rodent hunters and thus not in direct competition with Ethiopian wolves, it is likely that heavy human persecution prevents the former from attaining numbers large enough to completely displace the latter. Nevertheless, there is at least one record of an African wolf pack adopting a male Ethiopian wolf.

African wolves will feed alongside spotted hyenas, though they will be chased if they approach too closely. Spotted hyenas will sometimes follow wolves during the gazelle fawning season, as wolves are effective at tracking and catching young animals. Hyenas do not take to eating wolf flesh readily; four hyenas were reported to take half an hour in eating one. Overall, the two animals typically ignore each other when no food or young is at stake. Wolves will confront a hyena approaching too closely to their dens by taking turns in biting the hyena's hocks until it retreats.

African wolves in the Serengeti are known to carry the canine parvovirus, canine herpesvirus, canine coronavirus and canine adenovirus.

== In culture ==
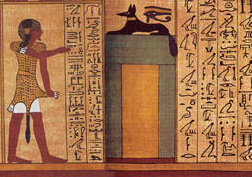
The African golden jackal was depicted as Anubis, Vignette from the Papyrus of Ani, British Museum

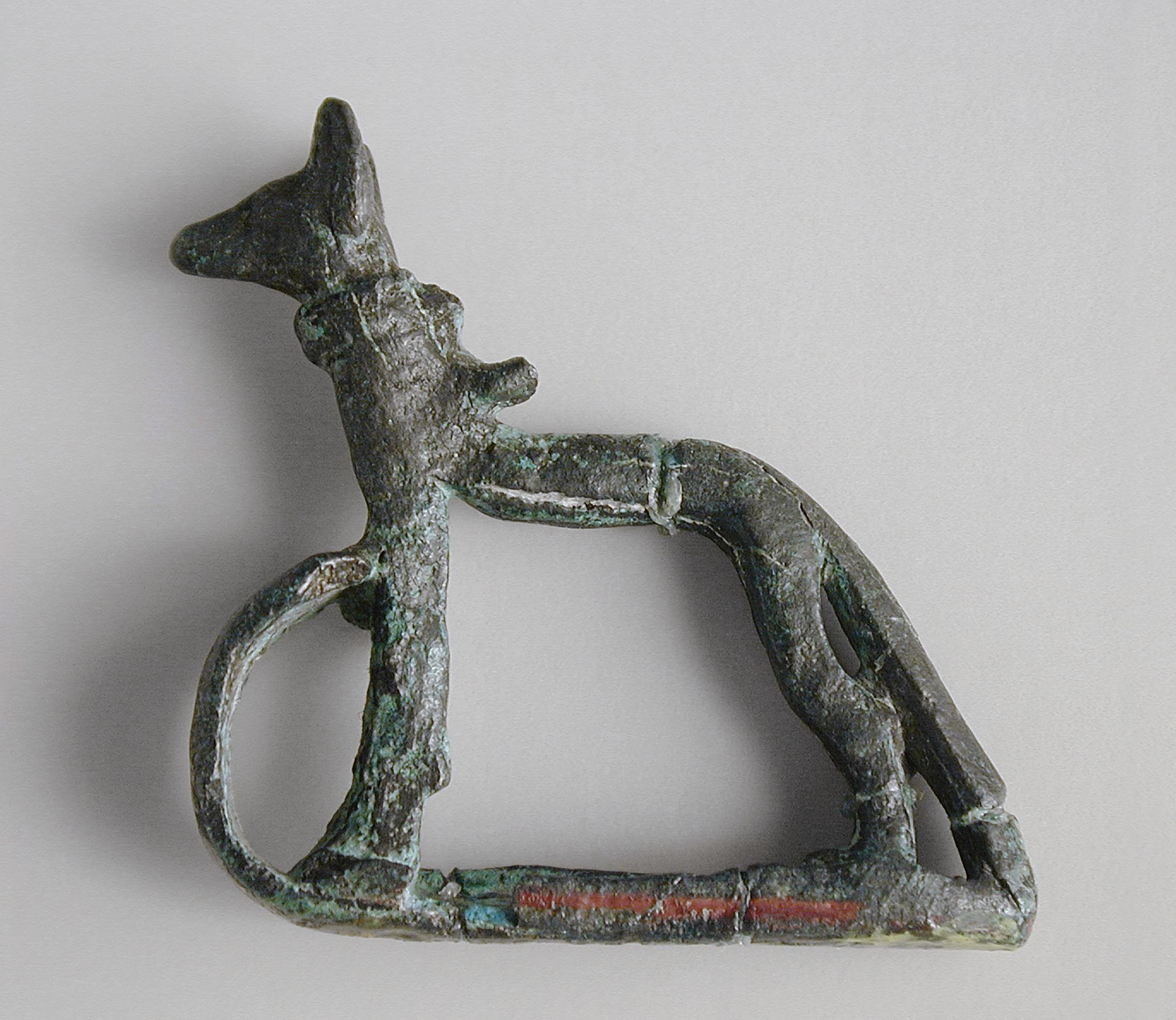
Wolf-shaped bronze amulet from Egypt's Ptolemaic Period (711–30 BCE)

The wolf was the template of numerous Ancient Egyptian deities, including Anubis, Wepwawet and Duamutef. The wolf was sacred in Lycopolis, whose inhabitants would mummify wolves and store them in chambers, as opposed to other areas of Egypt, where wolves were buried at their place of death. According to Diodorus Siculus in Bibliotheca historica, there were two reasons as to why the wolf was held in such high regard, the first being the animal's affinity to the dog, and the second being a legend that told of how Lycopolis received its name after a pack of wolves repelled an Ethiopian invasion. Plutarch noted in his On the Worship of Isis and Osiris that Lycopolis was the only nome in Egypt where people consumed sheep, as the practice was associated with the wolf, which was revered as a god. The importance of the wolf in Lycopolite culture continued through to the Roman period, where images of the animal were minted on the reverse sides of coins. Herodotus mockingly wrote of a festival commemorating Rhampsinit's descent to the underworld where a priest would be led by two wolves to the temple of Ceres.

Arab Egyptian folklore holds that the wolf can cause chickens to faint from fear by simply passing underneath their roosts, and associates its body parts with various forms of folk magic: placing a wolf's tongue in a house is believed to cause the inhabitants to argue, and its meat is thought to be useful in treating insanity and epilepsy. Its heart is believed to protect the bearer from wild animal attacks, while its eye can protect against the evil eye. Although considered haram in Islamic dietary laws, the wolf is important in Moroccan folk medicine. Edvard Westermarck wrote of several remedies derived from the wolf in Morocco, including the use of its fat as a lotion, the consumption of its meat to treat respiratory ailments, and the burning of its intestines in fumigation rituals meant to increase the fertility of married couples. The wolf's gall bladder was said to have various uses, including curing sexual impotence and serving as a charm for women wishing to divorce their husbands. Westermarck noted, however, that the wolf was also associated with more nefarious qualities: it was said that a child who eats wolf flesh before reaching puberty will be forever cursed with misfortune and that scribes and saintly persons refrain from consuming it even in areas where it is socially acceptable, as doing so would render their charms useless.

The African wolf is not common in Neolithic rock art, though it does occasionally appear; a definite portrayal is shown on the Kef Messiouer cave in Algeria's Tébessa Province, where it is shown feeding on a wild boar carcass alongside a lion pride. It plays a role in Berber mythology, particularly that of the Ait Seghrouchen of Morocco, where it plays a similar role in folktales as the red fox does in Medieval European fables, though it is often the victim of the more cunning hedgehog.

The African wolf plays a prominent role in the Serer religion's creation myth, where it is viewed as the first living creature created by Roog, the Supreme God and Creator. In one aspect, it can be viewed as an Earth-diver sent to Earth by Roog, in another, as a fallen prophet for disobeying the laws of the divine. The wolf was the first intelligent creature on Earth, and it is believed that it will remain on Earth after human beings have returned to the divine. The Serers believe that, not only does it know in advance who will die, but it traces the tracks in advance of those who will go to funerals. The movements of the wolf are carefully observed, because the animal is viewed as a seer who came from the transcendence and maintains links with it. Although believed to be rejected in the bush by other animals and deprived of its original intelligence, it is still respected because it dared to resist the supreme being who still keeps it alive.

== See also ==
- Ethiopian wolf
