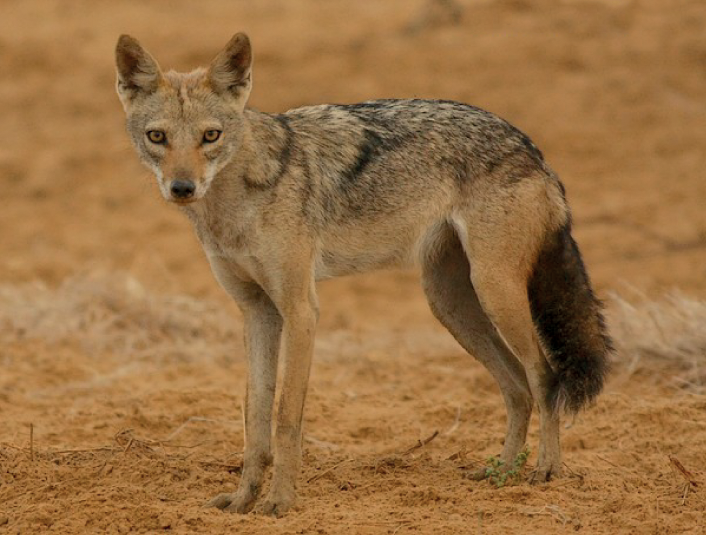

Scientific classification
- Kingdom: Animalia
- Phylum: Chordata
- Class: Mammalia
- Order: Carnivora
- Family: Canidae
- Genus: Canis
- Species: C. lupaster
- Subspecies: C. l. anthus

Trinomial name
- Canis lupaster anthus F. Cuvier, 1820

Synonyms
- C. aureus senegalensis (C. E. H. Smith, 1839)

= Senegalese wolf =

Subspecies of carnivore

The Senegalese wolf (Canis lupaster anthus), also known as the gray jackal, slender jackal or anthus, is the subspecies of the African wolf native to Senegal.

== Physical descriptions ==
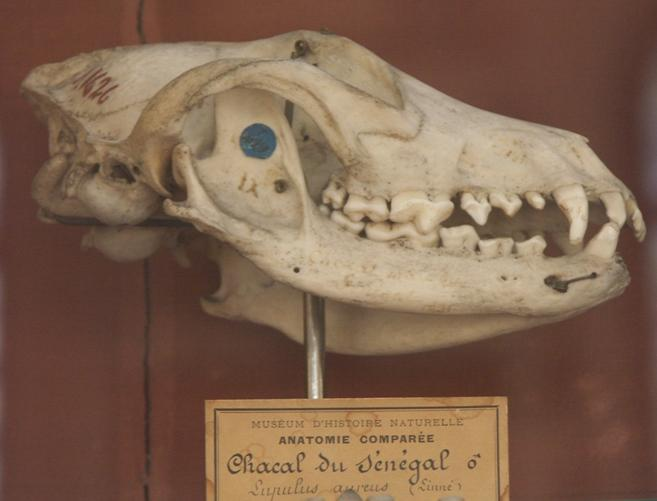
Skull of a Senegalese golden wolf from the Muséum national d'histoire naturelle

It is at least an inch (2.54 centimeters) higher at the shoulder, and several inches longer than the Egyptian wolf; adult Senegalese golden wolves are about 15 inches (38.1 cm) high on the midsection and 14 inches (35.56 cm) in length from tail to occiput. The ears are longer, and the head is more dog-like than that of the Egyptian wolf and measures 7 inches (17.78 cm) in length. The tail is not as hairy, and is shorter, being 10 inches (25.4 cm) long.

The nose and forehead are greyish-buff, while the throat and under parts are white. It lacks the black ring round the neck, nor the stippled arrangement of black points on the back characteristic of the Egyptian wolf. The flanks and back are of a deep grey colour, grizzled with yellow. The neck is greyish-fawn, with grey predominating especially on the cheeks and below the ears. The upper muzzle, limbs, the back of the ears and tail are of a pure fawn colour, while the rest of the body is whitish.
