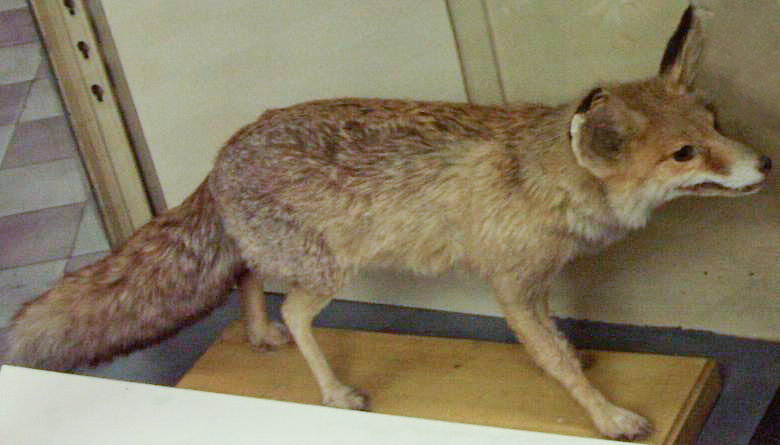

Scientific classification
- Kingdom: Animalia
- Phylum: Chordata
- Class: Mammalia
- Order: Carnivora
- Family: Canidae
- Genus: Vulpes
- Species: V. vulpes
- Subspecies: V. v. flavescens

Trinomial name
- Vulpes vulpes flavescens J. E. Gray, 1838

Synonyms
- V. v. cinerascens Birula, 1913; V. v. splendens Thomas, 1902

= Turkmenian fox =

Subspecies of carnivore

The Turkmenian fox (Vulpes vulpes flavescens), also known as the Turkmen fox, is an Asiatic subspecies of red fox distinguished by its very small size and primitive cranial features. It inhabits the Middle Asian plains and approximately south of latitude of Ustyurt Plateau and the Aral Sea, as well as contiguous parts of Iran, Afghanistan and Pakistan.

== Physical description ==
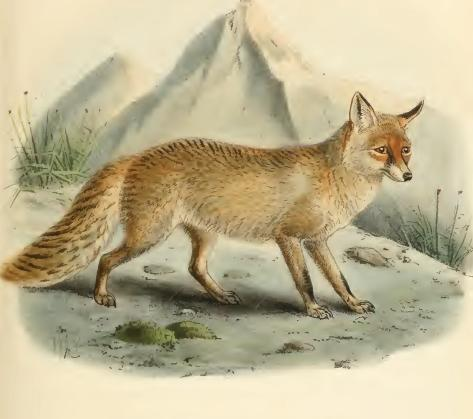
Illustration from Mivart's A monograph of the Canidæ

Compared to its northern cousins, the skull of the Turkmenian fox has a relatively large cranium with a weakly developed sagittal crest. Overall, the skull is much more paedomorphic than that of northern foxes. It is the smallest subspecies of red fox inhabiting Eurasia; adults attain a body length of 49–57.5 centimetres (19.3–22.6 in), a tail length of 33.5–39.5 cm (13.2–15.6 in), an ear length of 7.7–10 cm (3.0–3.9 in) and a weight of 2.2–3.2 kilograms (4.9–7.1 lb).

Unlike most other red fox subspecies, the Turkmenian fox either completely lacks reddish colour tones, or has in their place only light, sandy yellow tones. Generally, dull-yellowish or grey tones predominate. The head is sandy or yellowish-creamy in colour, with a whitish muzzle. A dark grey, reddish-brown or blackish-brown band is present in front of the eyes. The outer surface of the ears are either pure black or brownish-black. A cross-like figure is formed by overlapping yellow or brownish tones on the upper neck, back and shoulders. The flanks are usually grey, and are typically more brightly coloured than the back. The throat, chest and belly are whitish or grey. The feet are grey with dark stripes. It is not overly exploited by the fur trade, its fur being ten times cheaper than that of northern foxes.

== Behaviour ==
It primarily feeds on Afghan voles. When these are scarce, it will target invertebrates such as termites, beetles and grasshoppers. Plant food eaten by the Turkmenian fox includes pistachios, capers, watermelon, various grasses and seeds. Unlike most other red fox subspecies, the Turkmenian fox often hunts during the day, thus coinciding with the activity patterns of great gerbils. It may build temporary burrows in its desert environment, dug with an entrance facing south in order to shield itself from northerly winds. Turkmenian fox burrows have 3–5 entrances, but those located in appropriated gerbil colonies may have up to 15. Its reproduction is much more prolonged than that of northern foxes; pairs are formed in November, and begin mating throughout December and January. Kits are born in February–March.
