= Cosmocampus coccineus =

Scientific classification
- Kingdom: Animalia
- Phylum: Chordata
- Class: Actinopterygii
- Order: Syngnathiformes
- Family: Syngnathidae
- Genus: Cosmocampus
- Species: C. coccineus

Binomial name
- Cosmocampus coccineus (Herald, 1940)

Synonyms
- Syngnathus coccineus Herald, 1940; Syngnathus independencia Hildebrand, 1946

Species of fish

Cosmocampus coccineus is a species of pipefish from the family Syngnathidae. It is found in the eastern Pacific Ocean from Bahía de Banderas in Mexico south to Bahía de la Independencia, southern Peru, and in waters off the Galapagos Islands. It is common among red algae and coral, down to depths of 18 metres (59 ft). It is an ovoviviparous breeder in which the male carries the eggs in a brood pouch which is located under his tail. C. coccineus has been regarded as a subspecies of C. arctus, along with C. heraldi.
