= Cosmocampus hildebrandi =

American dwarf pipefish

Conservation status
- Least Concern (IUCN 3.1)

Scientific classification
- Kingdom: Animalia
- Phylum: Chordata
- Class: Actinopterygii
- Order: Syngnathiformes
- Family: Syngnathidae
- Genus: Cosmocampus
- Species: C. hildebrandi

Binomial name
- Cosmocampus hildebrandi Herald, 1965

Synonyms
- Syngnathus hildebrandi Herald, 1965

Species of fish

Cosmocampus hildebrandi (American dwarf pipefish) is a species of marine fish of the family Syngnathidae. It is found in the western Atlantic Ocean, off of the US coast from North Carolina south to the Gulf of Mexico, off the Yucatan Peninsula (Mexico), and off of northwestern Cuba. It inhabits sandy habitats with seagrass, coral, and rock substrates at depths of 5–75 metres (16–246 ft), where it can grow to lengths of 8.6 centimetres (3.4 in). This species is ovoviviparous, with males carrying eggs and giving birth to live young.

== Etymology ==
The specific name honours the ichthyologist Samuel F. Hildebrand (1883-1949), who first recognised the holotype as being possibly a new species.

== Identifying Features ==
This species has a stout body, with a squarish cross section. It is a pale brown colour, without any distinctive markings.
