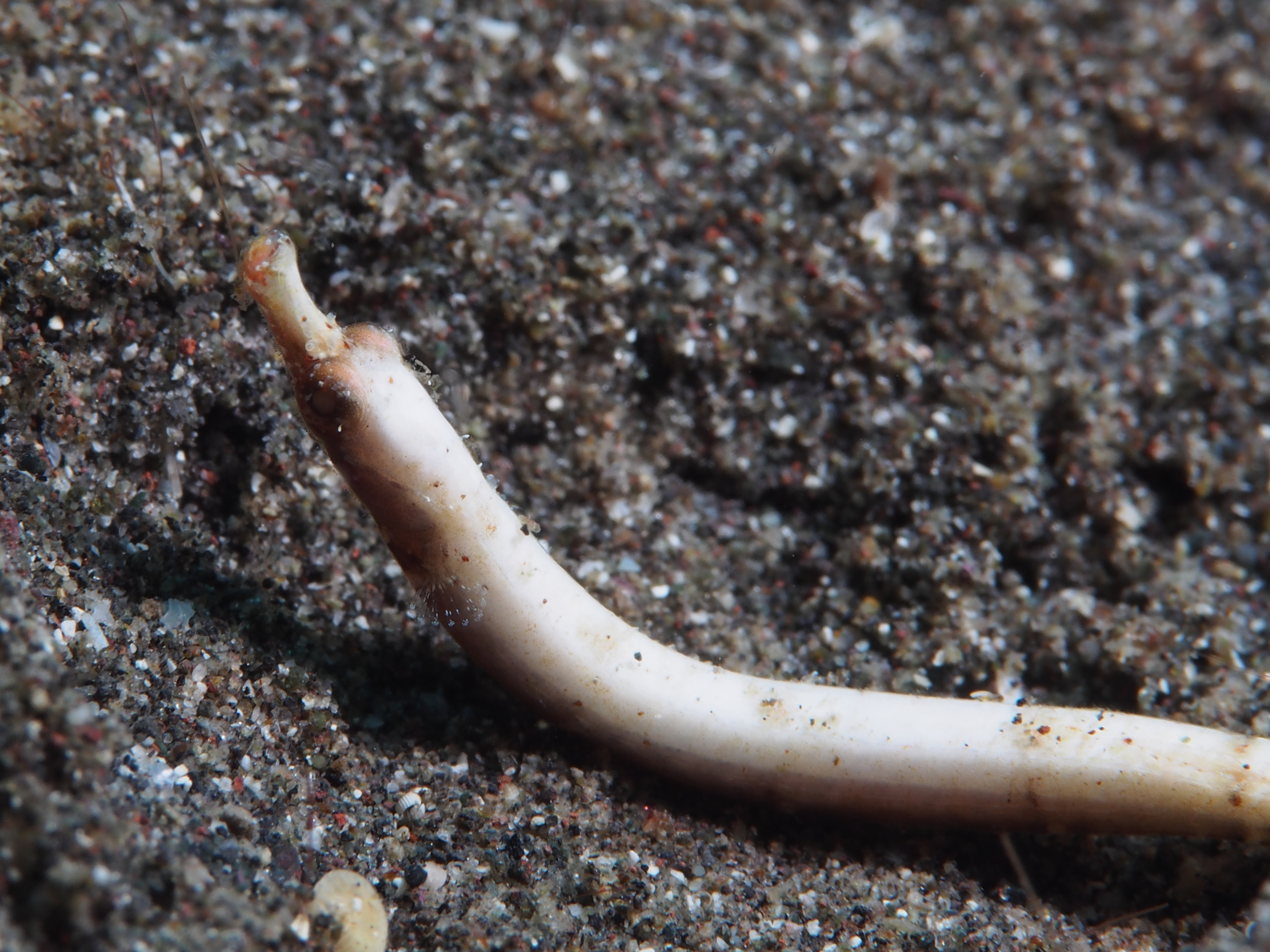

Conservation status
- Least Concern (IUCN 3.1)

Scientific classification
- Kingdom: Animalia
- Phylum: Chordata
- Class: Actinopterygii
- Order: Syngnathiformes
- Family: Syngnathidae
- Genus: Cosmocampus
- Species: C. banneri

Binomial name
- Cosmocampus banneri Herald & Randall, 1972

Synonyms
- Syngnathus banneri Herald & Randall, 1972

= Cosmocampus banneri =

Roughridge pipefish

Species of fish

Cosmocampus banneri (roughridge pipefish, or Banner's pipefish) is a species of marine fish of the family Syngnathidae. It is found from the Red Sea and Western Indian Ocean to Fiji, the Marshall Islands, and the Ryukyu Islands. It lives in coral reefs at depths of 2-30m, where it can grow to lengths of 5.8 cm. Although little is known about the feeding habits of C. banneri, it is expected to feed on small crustaceans similar to other pipefish. This species is ovoviviparous, with males carrying eggs in a brood pouch until giving birth to live young.

== Etymology ==
The specific name honours Albert Henry Banner (1914–1985), an American carcinologist who was an expert in alpheid shrimps.
