= Minyichthys brachyrhinus =

Conservation status
- Data Deficient (IUCN 3.1)

Scientific classification
- Domain: Eukaryota
- Kingdom: Animalia
- Phylum: Chordata
- Class: Actinopterygii
- Order: Syngnathiformes
- Family: Syngnathidae
- Genus: Minyichthys
- Species: M. brachyrhinus

Binomial name
- Minyichthys brachyrhinus Herald 1953

Species of fish

Minyichthys brachyrhinus is a species of marine fish belonging to the family Syngnathidae.

== Geography ==
They can be found in the coastal waters of Indonesia, Sumatra, the Philippines, Fiji, and Hawaii, though little is known about their preferred habitat in these areas.

== Diet ==
Their diet likely consists of small crustaceans such as copepods, amphipods, and mysid shrimps.

== Reproduction ==
Reproduction occurs through ovoviviparity in which the males brood eggs before giving live birth.
