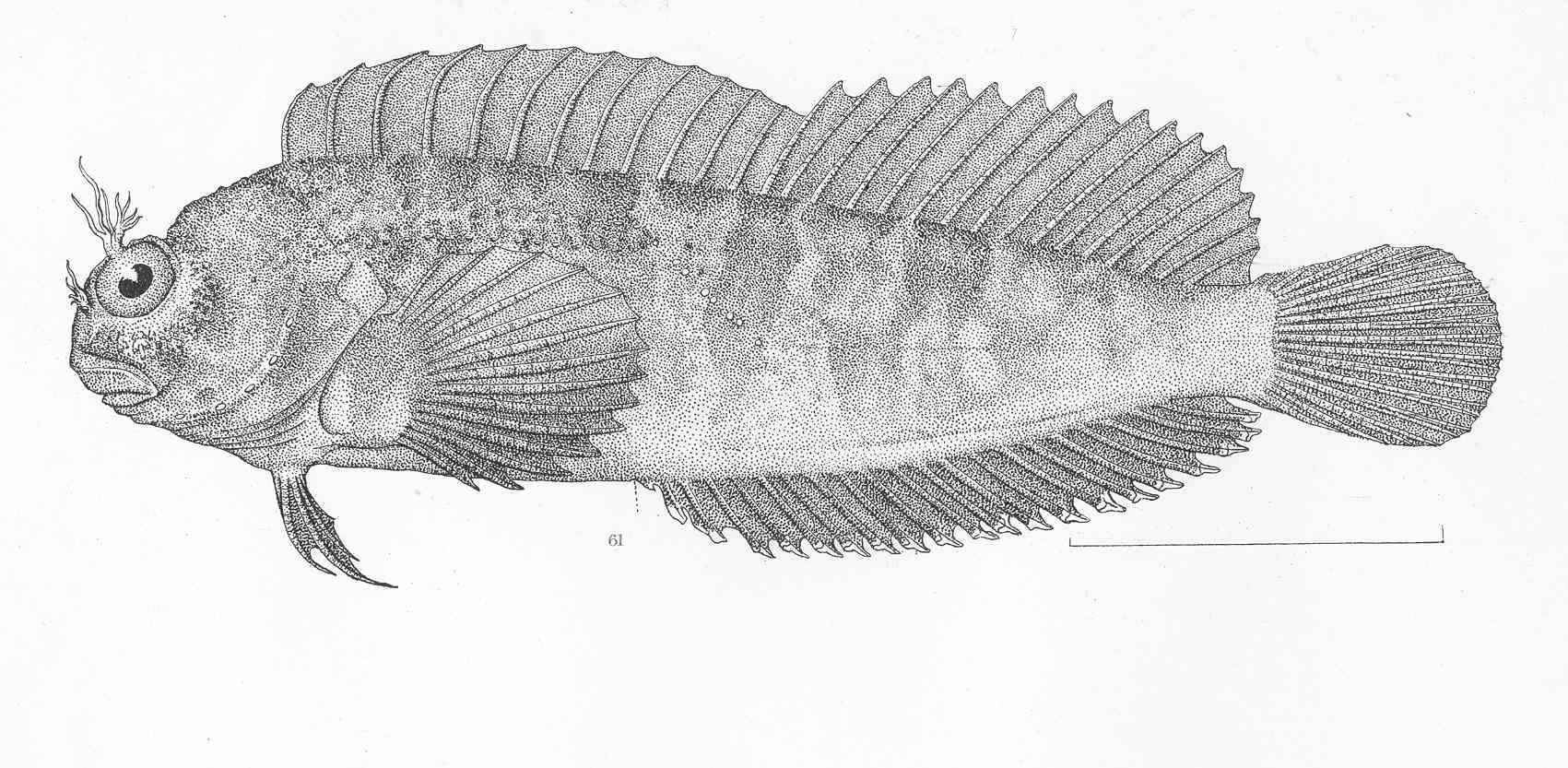

Conservation status
- Data Deficient (IUCN 3.1)

Scientific classification
- Kingdom: Animalia
- Phylum: Chordata
- Class: Actinopterygii
- Order: Blenniiformes
- Family: Blenniidae
- Genus: Hypsoblennius
- Species: H. caulopus

Binomial name
- Hypsoblennius caulopus (C. H. Gilbert, 1898)

Synonyms
- Homesthes caulopus Gilbert, 1898; Hypsoblennius lignus Meek & Hildebrand, 1928

= Hypsoblennius caulopus =

Species of fish

Hypsoblennius caulopus, the tidepool blenny, is a species of combtooth blenny found among rocky reefs of the eastern Pacific ocean. This species grows to a length of 9 centimetres (3.5 in) TL.
