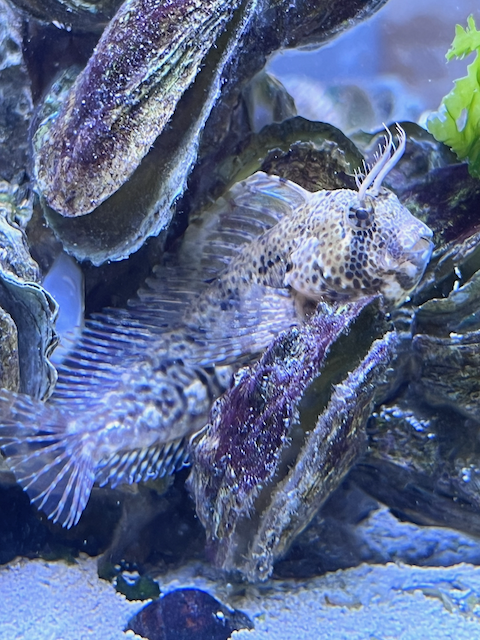
- Hypsoblennius hentz

Scientific classification
- Kingdom: Animalia
- Phylum: Chordata
- Class: Actinopterygii
- Division: Teleostei
- Order: Blenniiformes
- Family: Blenniidae
- Subfamily: Salariinae
- Genus: Hypsoblennius; T. N. Gill, 1861

Type species
- Blennius hentz Lesueur, 1825

Synonyms
- Blenniolus Jordan & Evermann, 1898; Homesthes Gilbert, 1898; Isesthes Jordan & Gilbert, 1883

= Hypsoblennius =

Genus of fishes

Hypsoblennius is a genus of combtooth blennies found in the Pacific and Atlantic Oceans.

== Species ==
There are currently 16 recognized species in this genus:

- Hypsoblennius brevipinnis (Günther, 1861) (Barnaclebill blenny)
- Hypsoblennius caulopus (C. H. Gilbert, 1898) (Tidepool blenny)
- Hypsoblennius digueti Chabanaud, 1943
- Hypsoblennius exstochilus J. E. Böhlke, 1959 (Longhorn blenny)
- Hypsoblennius gentilis (Girard, 1854) (Bay blenny)
- Hypsoblennius gilberti (D. S. Jordan, 1882) (Rockpool blenny)
- Hypsoblennius hentz (Lesueur, 1825) (Feather blenny)
- Hypsoblennius invemar Smith-Vaniz & Acero P., 1980 (Tessellated blenny)
- Hypsoblennius ionthas (D. S. Jordan & C. H. Gilbert, 1882) (Freckled blenny)
- Hypsoblennius jenkinsi (D. S. Jordan & Evermann, 1896) (Mussel blenny)
- Hypsoblennius maculipinna (Regan, 1903)
- Hypsoblennius paytensis (Steindachner, 1876)
- Hypsoblennius proteus (Krejsa, 1960) (Socorro blenny)
- Hypsoblennius robustus Hildebrand, 1946
- Hypsoblennius sordidus (E. T. Bennett, 1828)
- Hypsoblennius striatus (Steindachner, 1876) (Striated blenny)
