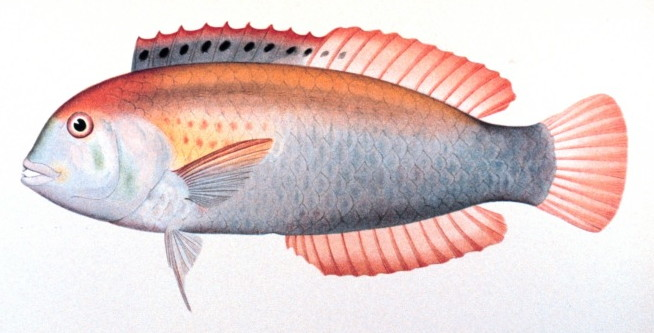

Conservation status
- Least Concern (IUCN 3.1)

Scientific classification
- Kingdom: Animalia
- Phylum: Chordata
- Class: Actinopterygii
- Order: Labriformes
- Family: Labridae
- Genus: Novaculops
- Species: N. woodi

Binomial name
- Novaculops woodi)Jenkins, 1901)

Synonyms
- Novaculichthys woodi Jenkins, 1901; Xyrichtys woodi (Jenkins, 1901); Novaculichthys entargyreus Jenkins, 1901; Novaculichthys tattoo Seale, 1901

= Novaculops woodi =

Species of fish

Novaculops woodi, the Hawaiian sandy or Wood's wrasse, is a species of marine ray-finned fish from the family Labridae, the wrasses. This wrasse is endemic to the Hawaiian Islands in the Pacific Ocean where it is found in areas of sandy rubble as depths of less than 48 metres (157 ft). Novaculops woodi was originally described as Xyrichtys woodi in 1901 by the American physiologist and histologist Oliver Peebles Jenkins (1850-1935) with the type locality given as Honolulu. peebles gave this species the specific name woodi in honour of the Stanford University professor of hygiene Thomas Denison Wood.
