= Hypsoblennius digueti =

Scientific classification
- Kingdom: Animalia
- Phylum: Chordata
- Class: Actinopterygii
- Order: Blenniiformes
- Family: Blenniidae
- Genus: Hypsoblennius
- Species: H. digueti

Binomial name
- Hypsoblennius digueti Chabanaud, 1943

Species of fish

Hypsoblennius digueti is a species of combtooth blenny found in the east-central Pacific ocean, around the Gulf of California. Some authors regard this taxon as a junior synonym of Hypsoblennius gentilis.
