= Hypsoblennius robustus =

Conservation status
- Least Concern (IUCN 3.1)

Scientific classification
- Kingdom: Animalia
- Phylum: Chordata
- Class: Actinopterygii
- Order: Blenniiformes
- Family: Blenniidae
- Genus: Hypsoblennius
- Species: H. robustus

Binomial name
- Hypsoblennius robustus Hildebrand, 1946

Species of fish

Hypsoblennius robustus is a species of combtooth blenny found in the south-eastern Pacific Ocean, from the Gulf of Guayaquil in southern Ecuador and Peru. This species grows to a length of 3.9 centimetres (1.5 in) SL.
