= Minyichthys =

Scientific classification
- Domain: Eukaryota
- Kingdom: Animalia
- Phylum: Chordata
- Class: Actinopterygii
- Order: Syngnathiformes
- Family: Syngnathidae
- Subfamily: Syngnathinae
- Genus: Minyichthys; Herald & J. E. Randall, 1972

Type species
- Micrognathus brachyrhinus Herald 1953

Genus of fishes

Minyichthys is a circumtropical genus of pipefishes consisting of species from the Indo-Pacific and eastern and western Atlantic regions. The genus is characterized as having a maximum standard length of about 60 mm, with two or three anal fin rays. Minyichthys species can be differentiated from members of the closely related genus Micrognathus by their higher frequency of total subdorsal rings (seven to 11 as opposed to three to seven).

Like many other pipefishes, male members of this genus carry their young in a brood pouch underneath the tail. These small, secretive fishes live in shallow algae or reef habitats, and in tidal pools and sheltered reef flats. Some species are known to venture into deeper waters.

== Species ==
The currently recognized species in this genus are:

- Minyichthys brachyrhinus (Herald, 1953) - Indo-Pacific
- Minyichthys inusitatus C. E. Dawson, 1983 - Atlantic
- Minyichthys myersi (Herald & J. E. Randall, 1972) (Myer's pipefish) - western Pacific to western Indian Ocean
- Minyichthys sentus C. E. Dawson, 1982 - eastern Atlantic
