= Minyichthys myersi =

Conservation status
- Least Concern (IUCN 3.1)

Scientific classification
- Domain: Eukaryota
- Kingdom: Animalia
- Phylum: Chordata
- Class: Actinopterygii
- Order: Syngnathiformes
- Family: Syngnathidae
- Genus: Minyichthys
- Species: M. myersi

Binomial name
- Minyichthys myersi (Herald & J. E. Randall, 1972)

Synonyms
- Micrognathus myersi Herald & Randall, 1972

Species of fish

Minyichthys myersi, also known as Myer's pipefish, is a species of marine fish belonging to the family Syngnathidae. They can be found inhabiting coral in many areas of the Indo-Pacific including Mauritius, Indonesia, the Philippines, Papua New Guinea, and French Polynesia. Their diet likely consists of small crustaceans such as copepods and amphipods. Reproduction occurs through ovoviviparity in which the males brood eggs before giving live birth.

== Etymology ==
The fish is named in honor of George S. Myers (1905-1985), from Stanford University.
