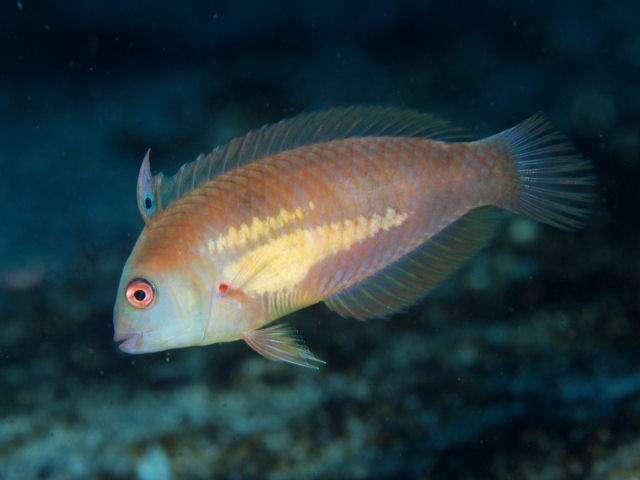
- Oriental sandy (N. sciistius)

Scientific classification
- Kingdom: Animalia
- Phylum: Chordata
- Class: Actinopterygii
- Order: Labriformes
- Family: Labridae
- Subfamily: Xyrichtyinae
- Genus: Novaculops; L. P. Schultz, 1960

Type species
- Novaculichthys woodi O. P. Jenkins, 1901

= Novaculops =

Genus of fishes

Novaculops is a genus of wrasses native to the Indian and Pacific Oceans.

== Species ==
The currently recognized species in this genus are:

Species	Common name	Image
Novaculops alvheimi J. E. Randall, 2013	St. Brandon's sandy	
Novaculops compressus Fukui, 2020	Garnet sandy	
Novaculops halsteadi (J. E. Randall & Lobel, 2003)	Halstead's sandy	
Novaculops koteamea (J. E. Randall & G. R. Allen, 2004)	Rapanui sandy	
Novaculops pastellus (J. E. Randall, Earle & L. A. Rocha, 2008)	Lord Howe sandy	
Novaculops sciistius (D. S. Jordan & W. F. Thompson, 1914)	oriental sandy	
Novaculops woodi (O. P. Jenkins, 1901)	Hawaiian sandy	
