= Virginia Aquarium =

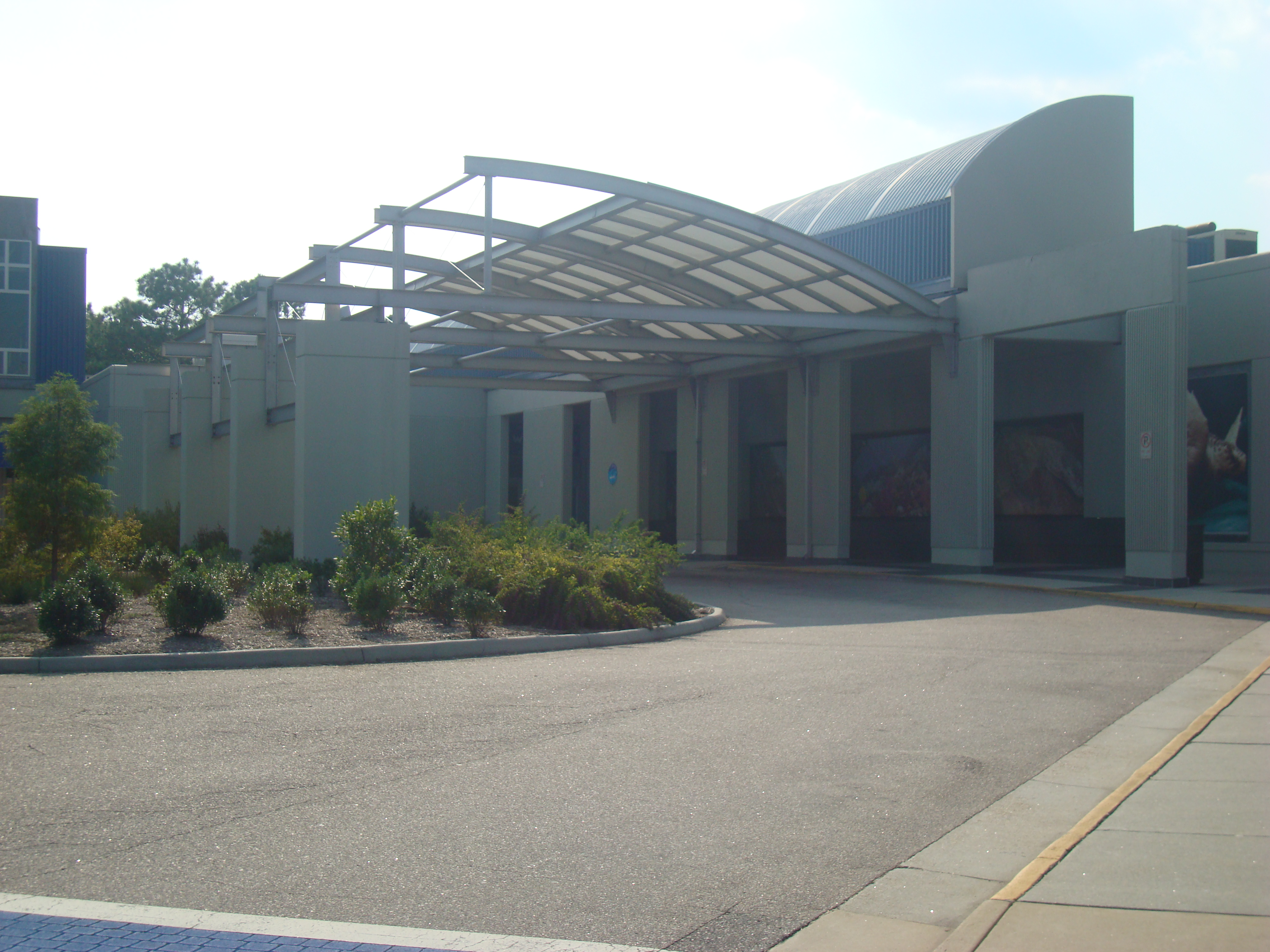
- Virginia Aquarium Main Entrance
- Interactive map of Virginia Aquarium
- 36.82105°N 75.98377°W
- Location: Virginia Beach, Virginia, USA
- No. of animals: 12,000
- No. of species: 700
- Total volume of tanks: 800,000 US gallons (3,028,000 L)
- Memberships: AZA, AMMPA
- Website: virginiaaquarium.com

The Virginia Aquarium & Marine Science Center, formerly known as the Virginia Marine Science Museum, is an aquarium and marine science museum located in Virginia Beach, Virginia, just south of Rudee Inlet. The exhibits at the museum are contained in over 800,000 US gallons (3,028,000 L) of fresh and saltwater displays.

== History ==
The aquarium opened on June 14, 1986, as the Virginia Marine Science Museum. The focus of exhibits was on life in the rivers of Virginia, the Chesapeake Bay, and the marine waters just off of Virginia. In 1995, the aquarium expanded, tripling its size. On November 21, 2009, the Virginia Aquarium opened a 12,000 square feet (1,100 m^{2}) series of exhibits called Restless Planet. The $25 million renovation designed by Chermayeff & Poole of Boston includes four habitats: Malaysian Peat Swamp, Coastal Sahara Desert, Red Sea, and Indonesia's Flores Island. The renovation doubled the number of species displayed by the aquarium. Some of the new animals include Komodo dragons, tomistomas, spotted eagle rays, and cuttlefish.

== Exhibits ==
The two main exhibit buildings of the aquarium are the Bay and Main Building and South Building. The two are connected by a one-third mile outdoor nature trail running alongside Owls Creek Salt Marsh. The area also contains the Adventure Park, a rope climbing course. Together the two buildings are home to more than 12,000 animals representing over 700 species.

=== Main Building ===
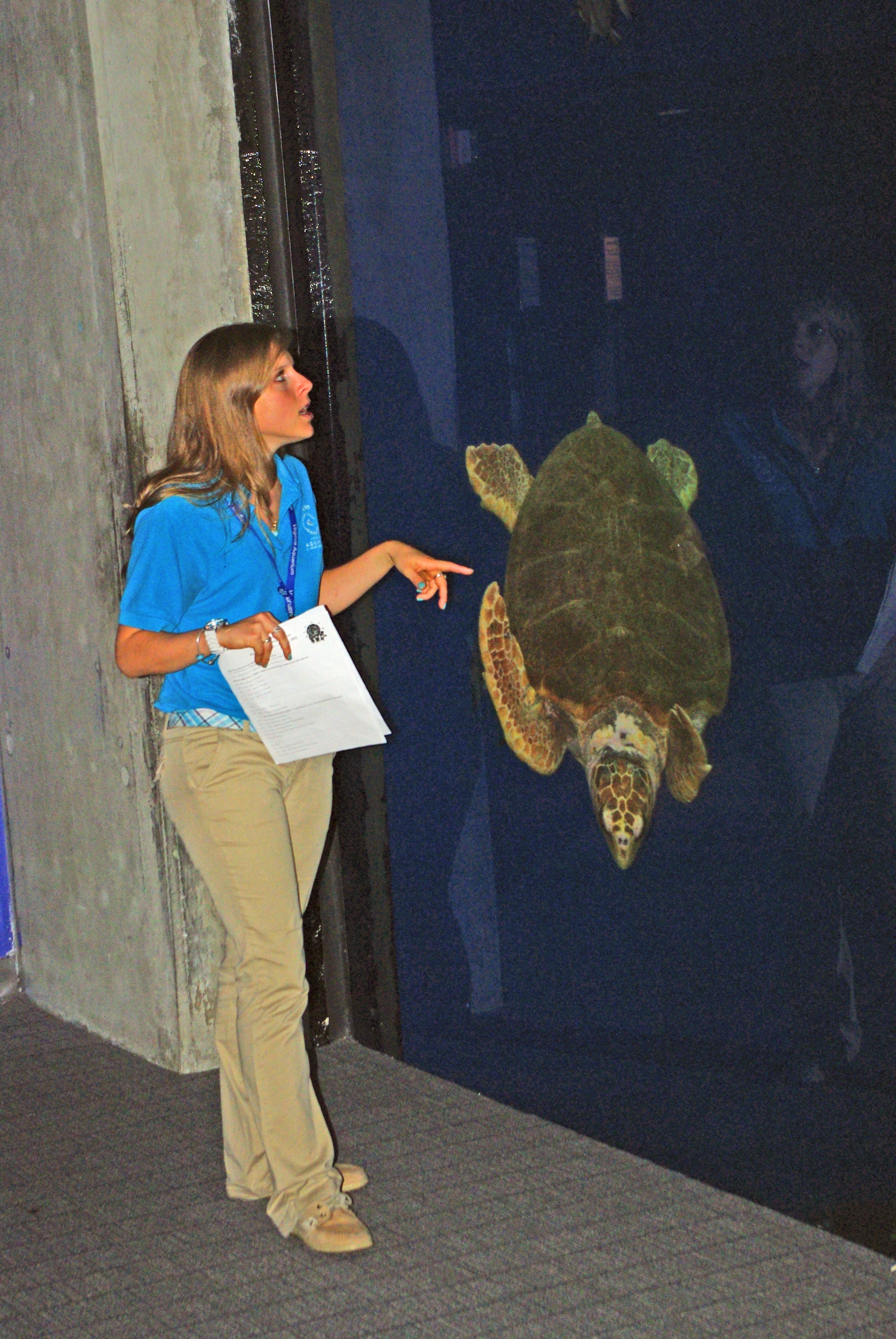
Tour guide at one of the exhibits.

The Main Building houses displays intended to show the journey of water from the rivers of Virginia, through the Chesapeake Bay, and out into the ocean. The Restless Planet part of the displays are intended to show the forces that shaped Virginia.

Chesapeake Bay Aquarium

The Chesapeake Bay Aquarium starts with a touch pool where visitors can touch horseshoe crabs, Forbes' sea stars, and whelk. The rest of the exhibit showcases species that live in the shallow waters around the Chesapeake Bay Bridge-Tunnel including hermit crabs, spider crabs, and Hypsoblennius hentz.

Norfolk Canyon Aquarium

The Norfolk Canyon aquarium replicates the underwater environment of the Norfolk Canyon, a canyon roughly 70 miles off the coast of Virginia. This exhibit is home to sandbar shark, nurse shark and sand tiger shark as well as fish such as crevalle jack, grey triggerfish and southern stingray.

Chesapeake Light Tower Aquarium

The 70,000-US-gallon (265,000 L) Chesapeake Light Tower Aquarium replicates the underwater environment of up to about 15 miles (24 km) off the coast of Virginia, and is home to loggerhead, green sea turtle, and Kemp's ridley sea turtle along with many fish including Atlantic spadefish, a large Atlantic goliath grouper, Atlantic tripletail, cobia, lookdown, and permits.

Restless Planet

The new Restless Planet expansion includes five immersive displays (a Malaysian peat swamp, the coastal desert, a replica of the Mediterranean Sea, the 100,000-US-gallon (379,000 L) Red Sea exhibit and a recreation of an Indonesian volcanic island), and new hands-on exhibits intended to show the forces that shaped the Virginia landscape into what it is today. Some of the animals in these exhibits include Komodo dragons, tomistomas, spotted eagle rays, zebra shark, Egyptian cobra, hedgehog and cuttlefish.

=== South Building ===
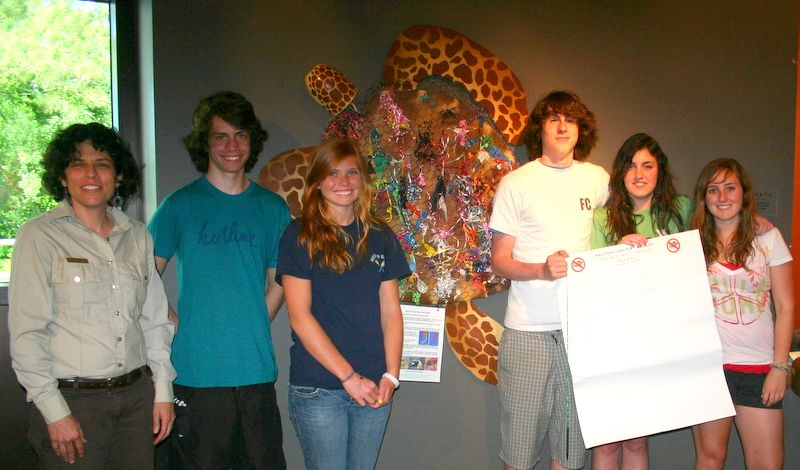
Outreach and education is an important part of the aquarium.

The South Building features North American river otters, a red octopus, moon jellies, and other animals. This new building gives guests behind-the-scenes access to the Vet Center, Stranding Response Program, and Water Quality Lab. The new building also includes a large outdoor play area for kids, with water tables, climbing nets, bubbles, and more. The Research and Conservation branch of the aquarium is responsible for the Stranding Response Program, which responds to sick or injured seals, dolphins, whales, and sea turtles from local shores. The Marsh Pavilion closed to the public for renovations on January 2, 2019.

=== Aviary ===
The Virginia Aquarium Aviary was a half-acre habitat located behind the March Pavilion, and was home to 70 birds of about 30 species including a great horned owl, turkey vultures, great blue herons, brown pelicans, fulvous whistling duck, great egrets, and ruddy ducks. Many of the birds had been injured and rehabilitated, and could not be released back into the wild. The aviary was badly damaged by a storm in the winter of 2015; though no birds were killed, most had to be dispersed to other wildlife centers. At the moment there is a crow on exhibit, with others off exhibit but used for educational programs. There are no current plans to rebuild the aviary.

=== Adventure Park ===
The Adventure Park at the Virginia Aquarium is an outdoor rope-climbing center, described as Virginia Beach's "largest and most exciting adventure park." It features over 250 elements, as well as over 30 ziplines, the longest one running over 300 feet over the nearby creek.
