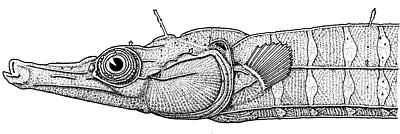
- Whitenose Pipefish (C. albisrostris)

Scientific classification
- Kingdom: Animalia
- Phylum: Chordata
- Class: Actinopterygii
- Order: Syngnathiformes
- Family: Syngnathidae
- Subfamily: Syngnathinae
- Genus: Cosmocampus; C. E. Dawson, 1979

Type species
- Corythoichthys albirostris Kaup, 1856

Synonyms
- Simocampus Fritzsche, 1980

= Cosmocampus =

Genus of fishes

Cosmocampus is a genus of pipefishes.

== Species ==
There are currently 14 recognized species in this genus:

- Cosmocampus albirostris (Kaup, 1856) (Whitenose pipefish)
- Cosmocampus arctus (O. P. Jenkins & Evermann, 1889) (Snubnose pipefish)
- Cosmocampus balli (Fowler, 1925) (Ball's pipefish)
- Cosmocampus banneri (Herald & J. E. Randall, 1972) (Roughridge pipefish)
- Cosmocampus brachycephalus (Poey, 1868) (Crested pipefish)
- Cosmocampus coccineus (Herald, 1940)
- Cosmocampus darrosanus (C. E. Dawson & J. E. Randall, 1975) (D'Arros pipefish)
- Cosmocampus elucens (Poey, 1868) (Shortfin pipefish)
- Cosmocampus hildebrandi (Herald, 1965) (Dwarf pipefish)
- Cosmocampus howensis (Whitley, 1948) (Lord Howe pipefish)
- Cosmocampus investigatoris (Hora, 1926)
- Cosmocampus maxweberi (Whitley, 1933) (Max Weber's pipefish)
- Cosmocampus profundus (Herald, 1965) (Deepwater pipefish)
- Cosmocampus retropinnis C. E. Dawson, 1982
