= Cosmocampus profundus =

Deepwater pipefish

Conservation status
- Data Deficient (IUCN 3.1)

Scientific classification
- Kingdom: Animalia
- Phylum: Chordata
- Class: Actinopterygii
- Order: Syngnathiformes
- Family: Syngnathidae
- Genus: Cosmocampus
- Species: C. profundus

Binomial name
- Cosmocampus profundus Herald, 1965

Synonyms
- Corythoichthys profundus Herald, 1965

Species of fish

Cosmocampus profundus (deepwater pipefish) is a species of marine fish of the family Syngnathidae. It is found near the southeastern US, the Virgin Islands, and the Yucatan Peninsula of Mexico. The few specimens of this species that have been collected were found over sand and coral at depths of 100-265m. This species is ovoviviparous, with males carrying eggs before giving birth to live young.
