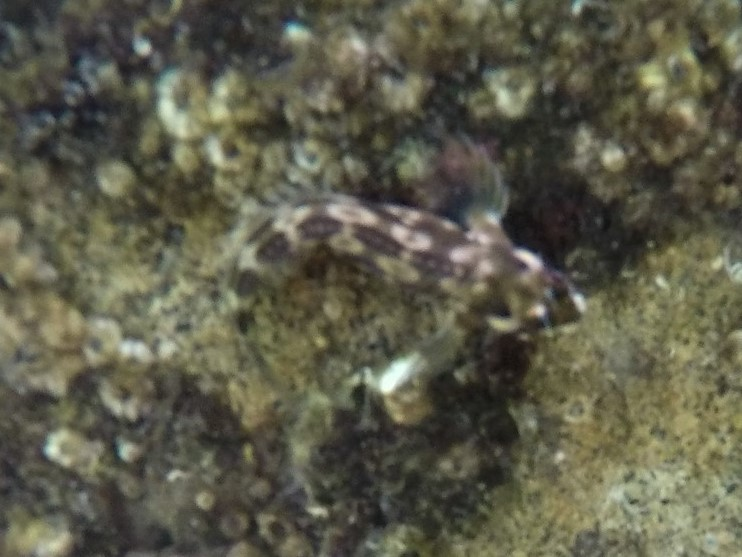

Conservation status
- Least Concern (IUCN 3.1)

Scientific classification
- Kingdom: Animalia
- Phylum: Chordata
- Class: Actinopterygii
- Order: Blenniiformes
- Family: Blenniidae
- Genus: Hypsoblennius
- Species: H. brevipinnis

Binomial name
- Hypsoblennius brevipinnis (Günther, 1861)

Synonyms
- Blennius brevipinnis Günther, 1861; Blenniolus brevipinnis (Günther, 1861)

= Hypsoblennius brevipinnis =

Species of fish

Hypsoblennius brevipinnis, commonly known as the barnaclebill blenny, is a species of combtooth blenny found on coral reefs in the eastern-central Pacific Ocean. This species grows to a length of 12 centimetres (4.7 in) TL.
