= Cosmocampus retropinnis =

Back-finned pipefish

Conservation status
- Data Deficient (IUCN 3.1)

Scientific classification
- Kingdom: Animalia
- Phylum: Chordata
- Class: Actinopterygii
- Order: Syngnathiformes
- Family: Syngnathidae
- Genus: Cosmocampus
- Species: C. retropinnis

Binomial name
- Cosmocampus retropinnis C. E. Dawson, 1982

Species of fish

Cosmocampus retropinnis (back-finned pipefish) is a species of marine fish of the family Syngnathidae. The name retropinnis comes from the location of the species' dorsal fin as either caudal or posterior. The coloration of this organism is mostly brown and tan markings on its snout side, head's dorsum, side of the trunk, and venter of the tail. It is only known from a few juvenile specimens collected off southern Morocco and Gambia at depths to 79m. Little is known about its feeding habits, but it is expected to feed on small crustaceans, similar to other pipefish. This species is ovoviviparous, with males carrying eggs before giving birth to live young.
