= Edward Alphonso Goldman =

American zoologist and botanist

Edward Alphonso Goldman (July 7, 1873 – September 2, 1946) was an American field naturalist and mammalogist. He worked extensively in Mexico with Edward William Nelson and described and revised many groups of mammals. He was considered a leading expert on the mammals of North America.

== History ==
He was born Edward Alphonso Goltman in Mount Carroll, Illinois, on July 7, 1873, to French-German American parents Jacob H. and Laura C. Goltman. They were originally from Pennsylvania before moving to Illinois, then to Nebraska, where Jacob changed the surname to Goldman, and finally California. There, Jacob, who had an interest in natural history, met naturalist Edward William Nelson, who was looking for an assistant, around 1891. Young Edward became this assistant, beginning a friendship and professional relationship with Nelson that was to last until the latter's death. Goldman did well on their first joint collecting trip in California, which ended in January 1892, and then set out for Mexico with Nelson for a three-month trip. In fact, they stayed for four years, beginning an acquaintance with Mexico that would take them to almost every corner of the country and result in the collection of over 20,000 mammal specimens.

He met Emma May Chase in 1901, and married her the next year, the marriage producing three sons. Beginning in 1910, he participated in a biological survey of the Panama Canal Zone, performing a baseline survey to gauge the environmental impact of the Panama Canal. While in the United States, Goldman performed many other functions, and during World War I he was a major in the U.S. Armed Forces in France working on rodent control. After being released from administrative duties in 1928, he was able to devote all his time to scientific study and he continued even after his 1944 retirement. Goldman collected his last mammal on April 4, 1946—a Florida pocket gopher. He continued to work on Mexican mammals until he had a stroke on August 30, 1946; he died on September 2, 1946, and was buried at Arlington National Cemetery on September 6.

His son, Luther Chase Goldman (1909–2005), became a notable naturalist, wildlife photographer, and conservation official. Luther worked for the U.S. Fish and Wildlife Service, served as chief photographer for the agency, managed several national wildlife refuges including those at the Salton Sea and Bitter Lake, and gained recognition for his photography of endangered bird species. During the Second World War, he also served as an entomologist in the U.S. Army.

== Work ==
Goldman published 206 papers during his lifetime and described over 300 new mammals. In 1941, he had described more new mammals than any other living scientist. More than fifty animals were named after him, including various mammals, some birds, a lizard (Sceloporus goldmani), a snake, a turtle, a frog, and a mollusk. There is even a Goldman Peak in Baja California. In 1946, he became the President of the American Society of Mammalogists.

Goldman was a proponent of exterminating large predators such as wolves and coyotes and was instrumental in promoting programs to that end via the Bureau of Biological Survey. He is credited with describing the coyote as the "archpredator of our time".

== Bibliography ==
- Henson, Pamela M. (2016). "A Baseline Environmental Survey: The 1910–12 Smithsonian Biological Survey of the Panama Canal Zone". Environmental History. 21 (2): 222–230. ISSN 1084-5453. JSTOR 24691581.
- Sterling, Keir B., ed. (1997). "Goldman, Edward Alphonso". Biographical Dictionary of American and Canadian Naturalists and Environmentalists. Greenwood Press.
- Young, Stanley P. (1947). "Edward Alphonso Goldman: 1873–1946" (subscription required). Journal of Mammalogy 28 (2): 91–109.
