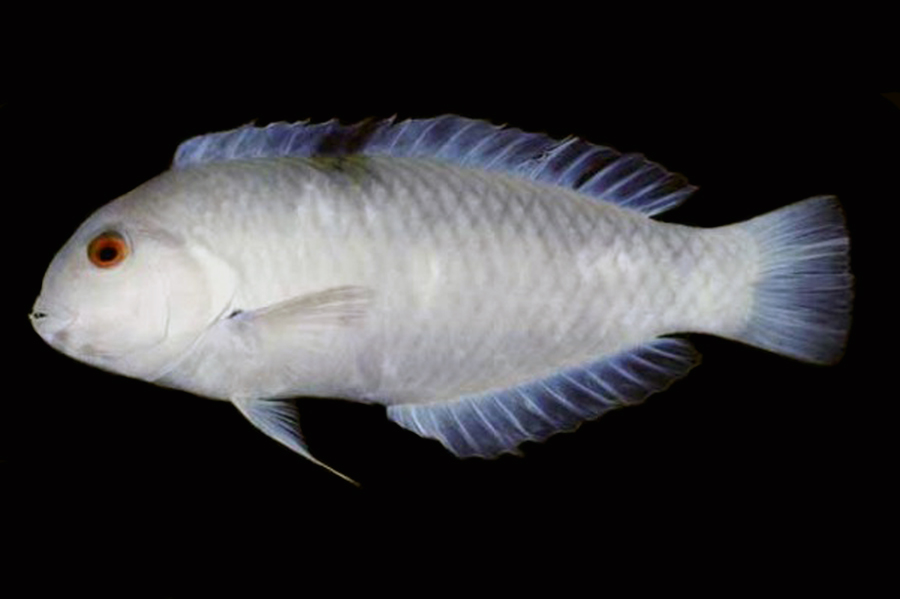

Conservation status
- Least Concern (IUCN 3.1)

Scientific classification
- Kingdom: Animalia
- Phylum: Chordata
- Class: Actinopterygii
- Order: Labriformes
- Family: Labridae
- Genus: Novaculops
- Species: N. pastellus

Binomial name
- Novaculops pastellus (Randall, Earle & Rocha 2008)

Synonyms
- Xyrichtys pastellus Randall, Earle & Rocha 2008

= Novaculops pastellus =

Species of wrasse

Novaculops pastellus, the Lord Howe sandy, is a fish of the family Labridae, subfamily Xyrichtyinae, commonly known as razorfishes. It's a rare fish known only from the Lord Howe Island region in the Tasman Sea, and inhabits open sandy bottoms. Like other razorfishes, it dives quickly into the sand when threatened. This species was originally described in the genus Xyrichthys and later transferred to Novaculops. It is listed as Least Concern in the IUCN Red List.
