= Hypsoblennius striatus =

Conservation status
- Near Threatened (IUCN 3.1)

Scientific classification
- Kingdom: Animalia
- Phylum: Chordata
- Class: Actinopterygii
- Order: Blenniiformes
- Family: Blenniidae
- Genus: Hypsoblennius
- Species: H. striatus

Binomial name
- Hypsoblennius striatus (Steindachner, 1876)

Synonyms
- Blennius striatus Steindachner, 1876

Species of fish

Hypsoblennius striatus, commonly known as the striated blenny, is a species of combtooth blenny found in coral reefs in the eastern-central Pacific Ocean, around Costa Rica and Panama. This species grows to a length of 8 centimetres (3.1 in) TL.
