= Cosmocampus investigatoris =

Investigator pipefish

Conservation status
- Least Concern (IUCN 3.1)

Scientific classification
- Domain: Eukaryota
- Kingdom: Animalia
- Phylum: Chordata
- Class: Actinopterygii
- Order: Syngnathiformes
- Family: Syngnathidae
- Genus: Cosmocampus
- Species: C. investigatoris

Binomial name
- Cosmocampus investigatoris Hora, 1926

Synonyms
- Syngnathus investigatoris Hora, 1926

Species of fish

Cosmocampus investigatoris (investigator pipefish) is a species of marine fish of the family Syngnathidae. It is found in the Indo-West Pacific, from the Persian Gulf to the Gulf of Thailand. It lives over sand, mud, and coral bottoms to depths of 15m, where it can grow to lengths of 9 cm. This species is ovoviviparous, with males carrying eggs in a brood pouch until giving birth to live young.
