= Cosmocampus darrosanus =

D'Arros pipefish

Conservation status
- Least Concern (IUCN 3.1)

Scientific classification
- Kingdom: Animalia
- Phylum: Chordata
- Class: Actinopterygii
- Order: Syngnathiformes
- Family: Syngnathidae
- Genus: Cosmocampus
- Species: C. darrosanus

Binomial name
- Cosmocampus darrosanus C. E. Dawson & Randall, 1975

Synonyms
- Syngnathus darrosanus Dawson & Randall, 1975; Syngnathus lumbricoides Maugé, 1981

Species of fish

Cosmocampus darrosanus (D'Arros pipefish or whiteface pipefish) is a species of marine fish of the family Syngnathidae. It is found in the Western Indian Ocean, Sri Lanka, Indonesia, Guam, and the Great Barrier Reef (Australia). It lives in tidepools and coral reefs to depths of 3 metres (9.8 ft), where it can grow to lengths of 7.4 centimetres (2.9 in). This species is ovoviviparous, with males carrying eggs before giving birth to live young.

== Etymology ==
The specific name is taken from the type locality of D'Arros Island in the Amirante Islands.
