= Minyichthys inusitatus =

West Atlantic pipefish

Conservation status
- Data Deficient (IUCN 3.1)

Scientific classification
- Kingdom: Animalia
- Phylum: Chordata
- Class: Actinopterygii
- Division: Teleostei
- Order: Syngnathiformes
- Family: Syngnathidae
- Genus: Minyichthys
- Species: M. inusitatus

Binomial name
- Minyichthys inusitatus C. E. Dawson 1983

Species of fish

Minyichthys inusitatus, also known as the West Atlantic pipefish, is a species of marine fish belonging to the family Syngnathidae. They have been be found off the coast of Panama and Northern Argentina, though little is known about their full geographic range or preferred habitat in these areas. Minyichthys inusitatus is thought to live primarily at depths of greater than 30–40 meters. Their diet likely consists of small crustaceans such as copepods, amphipods, and mysid shrimps. Reproduction occurs through ovoviviparity in which the males brood eggs before giving live birth. This small species grows only to lengths of around 2.9 cm on average.
