= Sceloporus goldmani =

Conservation status
- Endangered (IUCN 3.1)

Scientific classification
- Kingdom: Animalia
- Phylum: Chordata
- Class: Reptilia
- Order: Squamata
- Suborder: Iguania
- Family: Phrynosomatidae
- Genus: Sceloporus
- Species: S. goldmani

Binomial name
- Sceloporus goldmani H.M. Smith, 1937

Species of lizard

Sceloporus goldmani, also known commonly as Goldman's bunchgrass lizard and la lagartija de pastizal de Goldman in Mexican Spanish, is a species of lizard in the family Phrynosomatidae. The species is endemic to Mexico.

== Etymology ==
The specific name, goldmani, is in honor of American zoologist Edward Alphonso Goldman.

== Geographic range ==
S. goldmani is found in the Mexican states of Coahuila and San Luis Potosí.

== Habitat ==
The preferred natural habitat of S. goldmani is grassland, at altitudes of 1,600–2,200 m (5,200–7,200 ft).

== Reproduction ==
The mode of reproduction of S. goldmani has been described as viviparous and as ovoviviparous.
