= Luther Goldman =

American naturalist and wildlife photographer

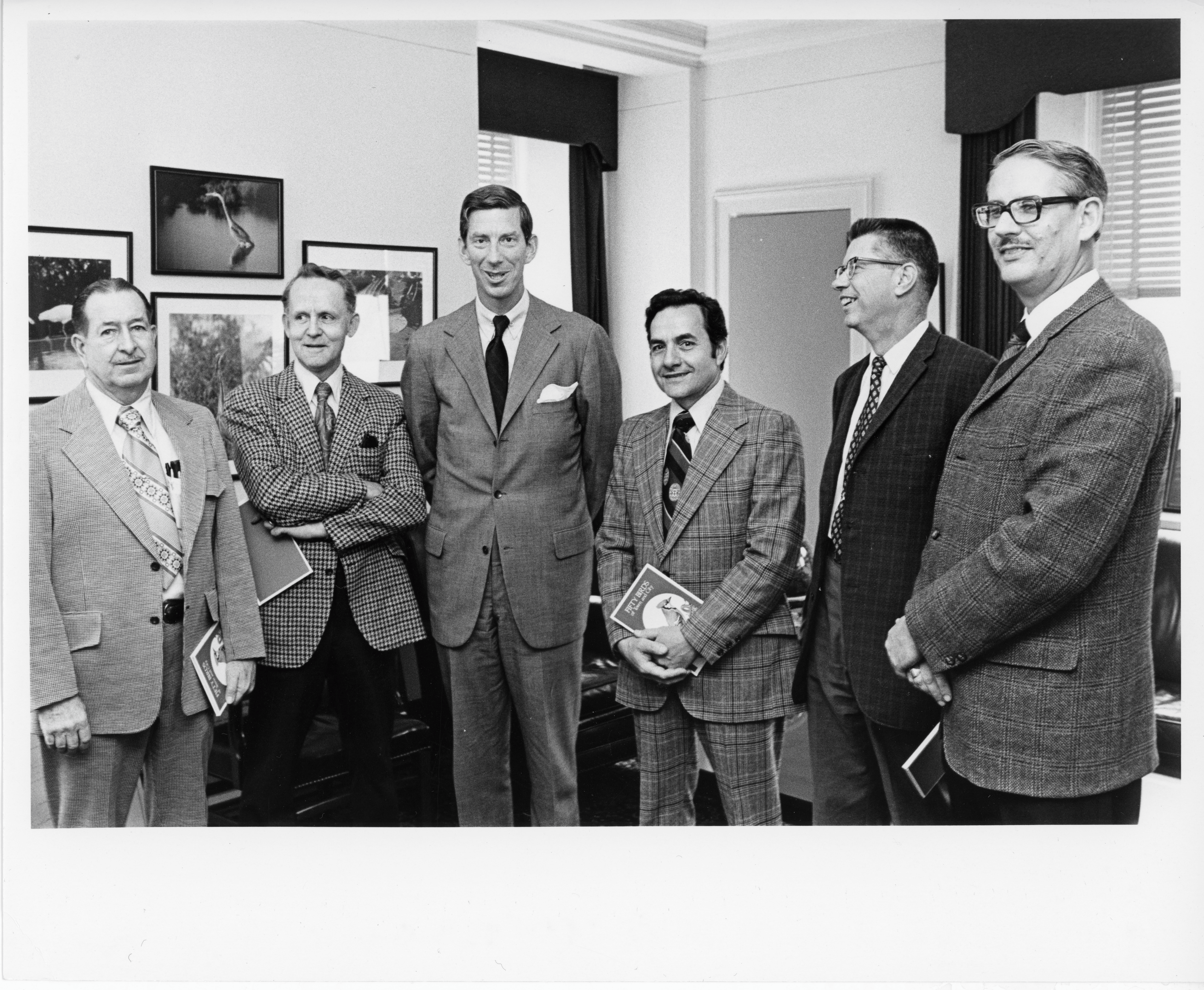
Goldman (left)

Luther Chase Goldman (November 2, 1909 – January 12, 2005) was an American naturalist and wildlife photographer. Best known for his photographs of endangered species of birds, he was chief photographer of the U.S. Fish and Wildlife Service.

== Biography ==
Goldman was born on November 2, 1909, in Washington, DC, the son of biologist Edward A. Goldman, and studied at the University of Maryland. He spent much of his career as a field biologist and photographer for the FWS, and was manager of several prominent nature preserves, including the Salton Sea and Bitter Lake refuges. During the Second World War, he served as an entomologist for the U.S. Army. He eventually became assistant chief of wildlife management for the U.S.

He died on January 12, 2005 in Lanham, Maryland at the age of 95.
