= Cosmocampus heraldi =

Conservation status
- Data Deficient (IUCN 3.1)

Scientific classification
- Kingdom: Animalia
- Phylum: Chordata
- Class: Actinopterygii
- Order: Syngnathiformes
- Family: Syngnathidae
- Genus: Cosmocampus
- Species: C. heraldi

Binomial name
- Cosmocampus heraldi Fritzsche, 1980

Synonyms
- Bryx heraldi Fritzsche, 1980; Cosmocampus arctus subsp. heraldi Fritzche, 1980

Species of fish

Cosmocampus heraldi is a species of marine fish of the family Syngnathidae. It is known from only seven specimens, which were found at the Desventuradas and Juan Fernandez Islands in Chile. It inhabits rocky reefs and sandy areas at depths of 6–23 metres (20–75 ft), where it can grow to lengths of 7 centimetres (2.8 in). It is expected to feed on small crustaceans like other pipefish. This species is ovoviviparous, with males carrying eggs until giving birth to live young.

== Etymology ==
Described by Ronald Alan Fritzsche, the specific name honours the ichthyologist Earl Stannard Herald (1914-1973) who had a lifelong interest in pipefish.
