= Novaculops alvheimi =

Scientific classification
- Kingdom: Animalia
- Phylum: Chordata
- Class: Actinopterygii
- Order: Labriformes
- Family: Labridae
- Genus: Novaculops
- Species: N. alvheimi

Binomial name
- Novaculops alvheimi Randall, 2013

Species of fish

Novaculops alvheimi is a species of labrid fish discovered in St Brandon atoll (Cargados Carajos), Mauritius in May 2013.
