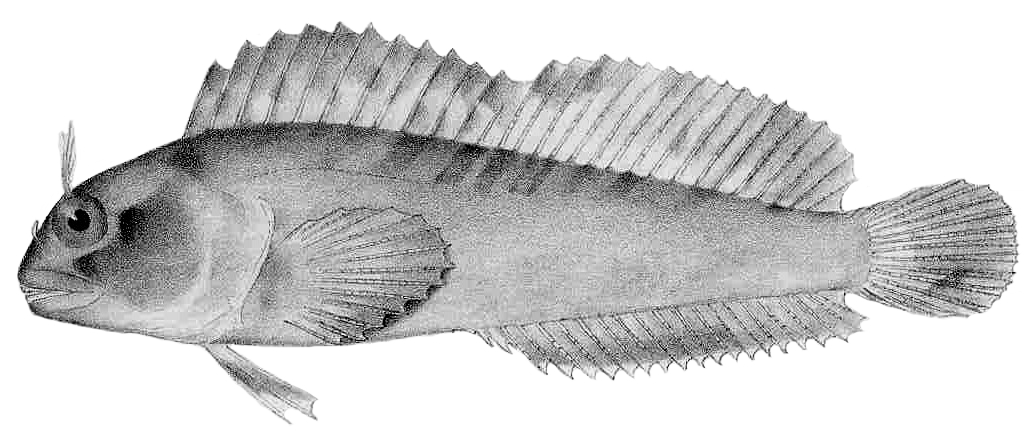

Conservation status
- Least Concern (IUCN 3.1)

Scientific classification
- Kingdom: Animalia
- Phylum: Chordata
- Class: Actinopterygii
- Order: Blenniiformes
- Family: Blenniidae
- Genus: Hypsoblennius
- Species: H. jenkinsi

Binomial name
- Hypsoblennius jenkinsi (D. S. Jordan & Evermann, 1896)

Synonyms
- Chasmodes jenkinsi Jordan & Evermann, 1896

= Hypsoblennius jenkinsi =

Species of fish

Hypsoblennius jenkinsi, commonly known as the mussel blenny, is a species of combtooth blenny found in the eastern-central Pacific Ocean. This species grows to a length of 13 centimetres (5.1 in) TL. The specific name honours Oliver Peebles Jenkins (1850–1935), who was professor of physiology at Stanford University.
