= Minyichthys sentus =

Conservation status
- Data Deficient (IUCN 3.1)

Scientific classification
- Kingdom: Animalia
- Phylum: Chordata
- Class: Actinopterygii
- Order: Syngnathiformes
- Family: Syngnathidae
- Genus: Minyichthys
- Species: M. sentus

Binomial name
- Minyichthys sentus C. E. Dawson, 1982

Species of fish

Minyichthys sentus is a species of marine fish belonging to the family Syngnathidae. Little is known about this species preferred habitat and their proposed geographic distribution is based on only three specimens, two found in the Atlantic near Southern Spain and one found in the Mediterranean near Gibraltar. They have been recorded at depths of up to 170 meters.
