= Cosmocampus elucens =

Shortfin pipefish

Conservation status
- Least Concern (IUCN 3.1)

Scientific classification
- Domain: Eukaryota
- Kingdom: Animalia
- Phylum: Chordata
- Class: Actinopterygii
- Order: Syngnathiformes
- Family: Syngnathidae
- Genus: Cosmocampus
- Species: C. elucens

Binomial name
- Cosmocampus elucens Poey, 1868

Synonyms
- Siphostoma robertsi Jordan & Rutter, 1897; Syngnathus ascendens Poey, 1876; Syngnathus elucens Poey, 1868; Syngnathus flavirostris Poey, 1876; Syngnathus marmoreus Poey, 1876; Syngnathus modestus Günther, 1870; Syngnathus pipulus Beebe & Tee-Van, 1932; Syngnathus linea Poey, 1876; Syngnathus picturatus Poey, 1876; Syngnathus walcotti Nichols, 1937

Species of fish

Cosmocampus elucens (shortfin pipefish, or Poey's pipefish) is a species of marine fish of the family Syngnathidae. It is found in the western Atlantic, off the U.S. east coast, Bermuda, the Bahamas, the Gulf of Mexico, throughout the Caribbean Sea, and off the coast of Brazil. It lives in seagrass and algae beds, typically at shallow depths (although it has been found at depths up to 78 metres (256 ft)), where it can grow to lengths of 15 centimetres (5.9 in). It is expected to feed on small crustaceans, similar to other pipefishes. This species is ovoviviparous, with males carrying eggs and giving birth to live young.

== Identifying features ==
This species can be identified by its slender body, tan to greenish brown colouring, mottled upper body and sides, widely spaced pale bars along its trunk, and pair of dark stripes behind its eyes.
