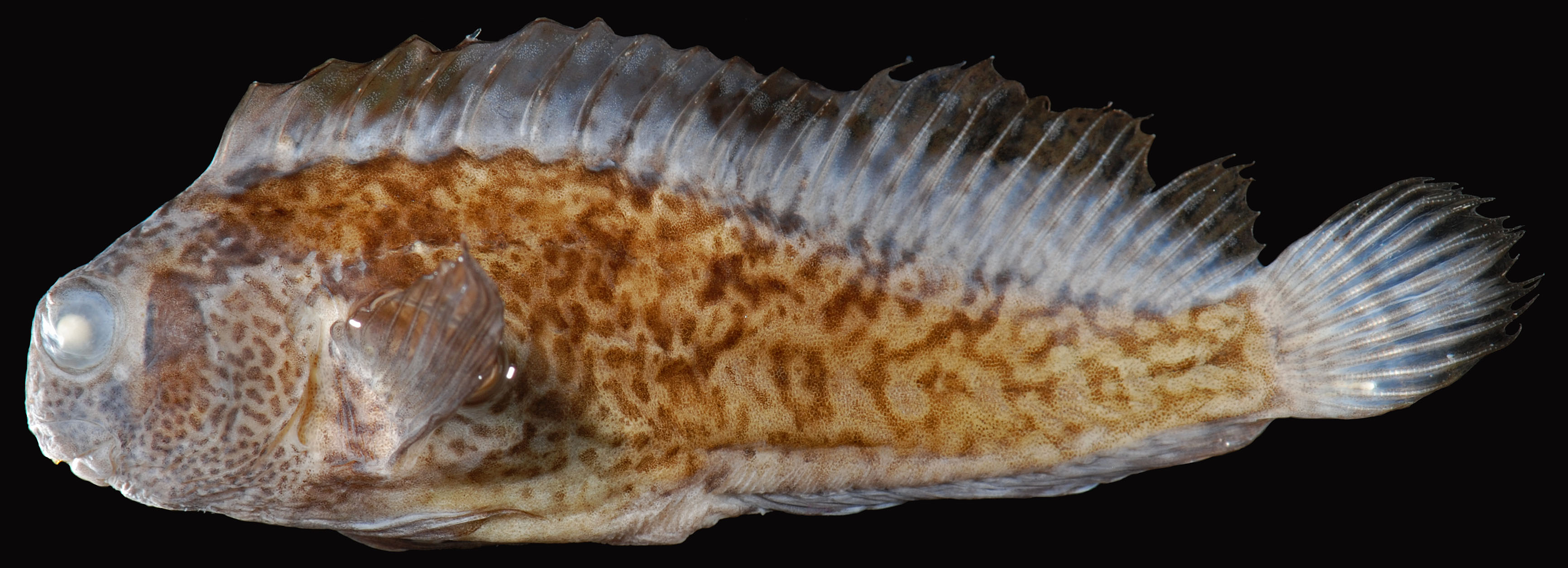

Conservation status
- Least Concern (IUCN 3.1)

Scientific classification
- Kingdom: Animalia
- Phylum: Chordata
- Class: Actinopterygii
- Order: Blenniiformes
- Family: Blenniidae
- Genus: Hypsoblennius
- Species: H. ionthas

Binomial name
- Hypsoblennius ionthas (D. S. Jordan & C. H. Gilbert, 1882)

Synonyms
- Isesthes ionthas Jordan & Gilbert, 1882

= Hypsoblennius ionthas =

Species of fish

Hypsoblennius ionthas, commonly known as the freckled blenny, is a species of combtooth blenny found in the western Atlantic Ocean.

== Description ==
This species grows to a length of 10 centimetres (3.9 in) TL. it has an elongate body with long anal and dorsal fins. It has small, chisel-like teeth that are useful for consuming algae from tough surface. It ranges in color from yellowish to green brown.

== Distribution ==
The species ranges from North Carolina in the Atlantic to the Gulf of Mexico and Aransas Bay, Texas. It generally enjoys inhabiting shallow bays and estuaries, dwelling in oyster reefs. It seems to prefer harder bottoms and waters with less salinity. It is more common than the feather blenny along the Gulf Coast.
