= Cosmocampus arctus =

Snubnose pipefish

Conservation status
- Least Concern (IUCN 3.1)

Scientific classification
- Domain: Eukaryota
- Kingdom: Animalia
- Phylum: Chordata
- Class: Actinopterygii
- Order: Syngnathiformes
- Family: Syngnathidae
- Genus: Cosmocampus
- Species: C. arctus

Binomial name
- Cosmocampus arctus Jenkins & Evermann, 1889

Synonyms
- Bryx arctus Jenkins & Evermann, 1889; Siphostoma arctum Jenkins & Evermann, 1889; Syngnathus independencia Hildebrand, 1946

Species of fish

Cosmocampus arctus (snubnose pipefish) is a species of marine fish of the family Syngnathidae. It is found from Tomales Bay, California, to Mazatlan, Mexico, and throughout the Gulf of California. It lives on rocky or coral reefs, among eelgrass and other seaweeds, and among algae. It inhabits depths to 10m, where it can grow to lengths of 12 cm. This species is ovoviviparous, with males carrying eggs in a brood pouch before giving birth to live young. Monogamous mating has also been observed in this species.
