= Heraldia =

Conservation status
- Least Concern (IUCN 3.1)

Scientific classification
- Kingdom: Animalia
- Phylum: Chordata
- Class: Actinopterygii
- Division: Teleostei
- Order: Syngnathiformes
- Family: Syngnathidae
- Subfamily: Nerophinae
- Genus: Heraldia
- Species: H. nocturna

Binomial name
- Heraldia nocturna Paxton, 1975

Species of fish

The upside-down pipefish (Heraldia nocturna) is a species of pipefish endemic to the coasts of southern Australia, from New South Wales to Geographe Bay in Western Australia, where it is found in rocky reefs at depths of from 2 to 15 metres (6.6 to 49.2 ft). It grows to a length of 9.2 centimetres (3.6 in) SL. This species is the only known member of its genus. Like other pipefish it is ovoviviparous but it may breed seasonally, as gravid males have been collected between September and November.

== Etymology ==
This genus was named in honor of Earl Stannard Herald, an American expert on syngnathids who died as a result of a diving accident off of Cabo San Lucas, Mexico. The common name, "upside-down pipefish", comes from its habit of swimming upside down in caves before emerging at night to feed, and this nocturnal habit gives rise to its specific name, nocturna.
