= Biological Survey of Panama =

Between 1910 and 1912, the Smithsonian Institution in collaboration with the Field Museum of Chicago and the University of Chicago undertook a comprehensive biological survey of Panama prior to the completion of the Panama Canal.

Participants included Edward Alphonso Goldman of the Bureau of Biological Survey; Seth Eugene Meek of the Field Museum of Natural History and Samuel F. Hildebrand who collected reptiles, amphibians and fishes; Eugene Amandus Schwarz and August Busck of the Agriculture Department’s Bureau of Entomology who focused on insects; plants were collected by Henri Pittier and Albert Spear Hitchcock of the Agriculture Department’s Bureau of Plant Industry and William Ralph Maxon from the United States National Museum.
