= Hypsoblennius proteus =

Conservation status
- Vulnerable (IUCN 3.1)

Scientific classification
- Kingdom: Animalia
- Phylum: Chordata
- Class: Actinopterygii
- Order: Blenniiformes
- Family: Blenniidae
- Genus: Hypsoblennius
- Species: H. proteus

Binomial name
- Hypsoblennius proteus (Krejsa, 1960)

Species of fish

Hypsoblennius proteus, commonly known as the Socorro blenny, is a species of combtooth blenny found in the eastern central Pacific Ocean. It is endemic to the waters around the island of Socorro in the Revillagigedo Islands of Colima state in western Mexico.

This species grows to a length of 2.6 centimetres (1.0 in) SL.

The IUCN classify this species as Vulnerable because the increasing frequency of El Niño events cause the shallow waters of the eastern Pacific Ocean to increase in temperature for extended species. These higher temperatures are thought to be too warm for many species and population declines have been noted. H. proteus has a restricted range, occurs in shallow waters and its range is affected by these more frequent El Niño events.
