= Hypsoblennius paytensis =

Conservation status
- Least Concern (IUCN 3.1)

Scientific classification
- Kingdom: Animalia
- Phylum: Chordata
- Class: Actinopterygii
- Order: Blenniiformes
- Family: Blenniidae
- Genus: Hypsoblennius
- Species: H. paytensis

Binomial name
- Hypsoblennius paytensis (Steindachner, 1876)

Synonyms
- Blennius paytensis Steindachner, 1876; Parahypsos paytensis (Steindachner, 1876)

Species of fish

Hypsoblennius paytensis is a species of combtooth blenny found in the eastern Pacific Ocean, from Costa Rica to Peru.
