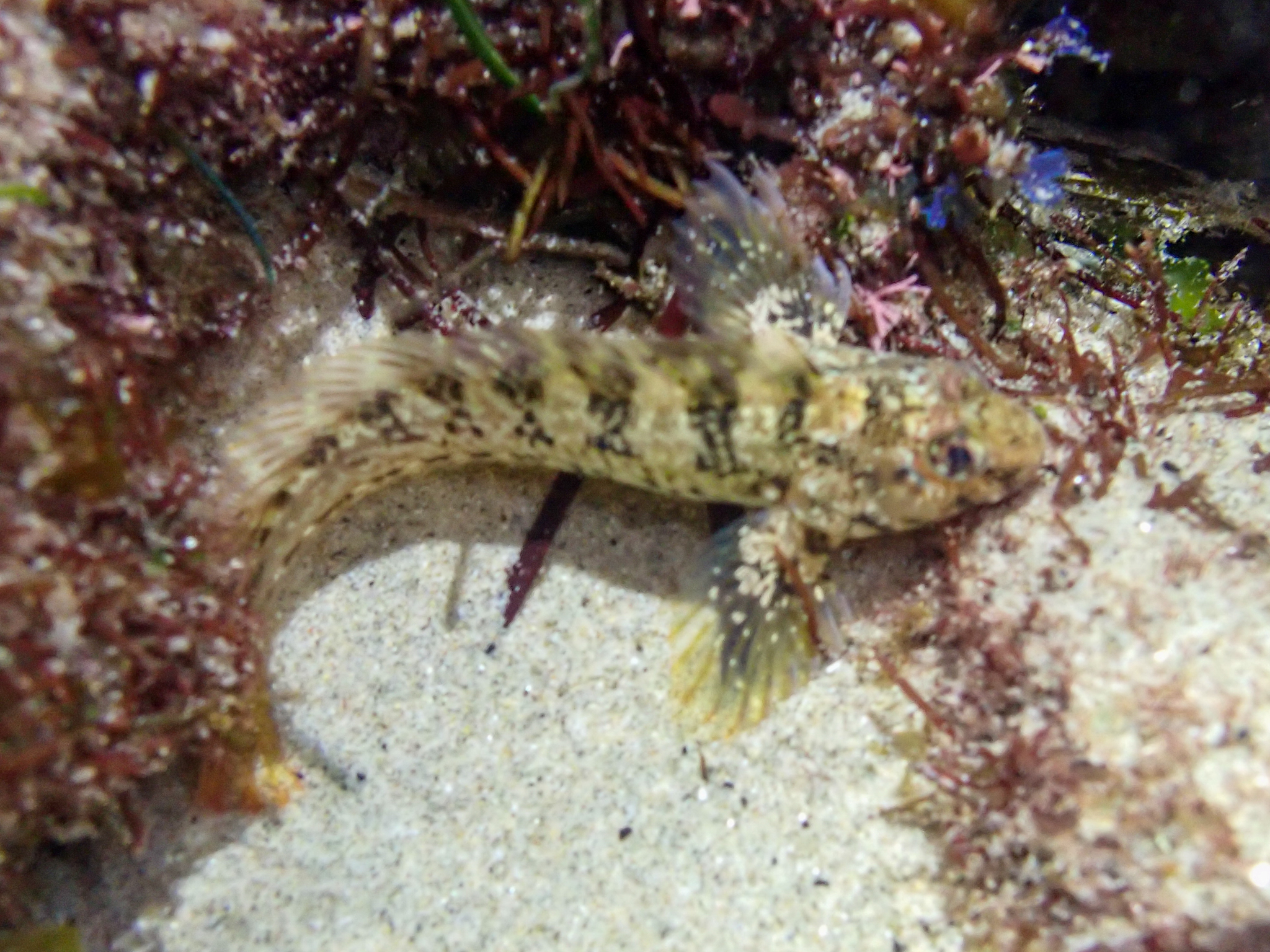

Conservation status
- Least Concern (IUCN 3.1)

Scientific classification
- Kingdom: Animalia
- Phylum: Chordata
- Class: Actinopterygii
- Order: Blenniiformes
- Family: Blenniidae
- Genus: Hypsoblennius
- Species: H. gilberti

Binomial name
- Hypsoblennius gilberti (D. S. Jordan, 1882)

Synonyms
- Isesthes gilberti Jordan, 1882

= Hypsoblennius gilberti =

Species of fish

Hypsoblennius gilberti, commonly known as the rockpool blenny, is a species of combtooth blenny found in the eastern Pacific Ocean. This species grows to a length of 17 centimetres (6.7 in) TL. The specific name honours the American ichthyologist Charles H. Gilbert (1859–1928).
