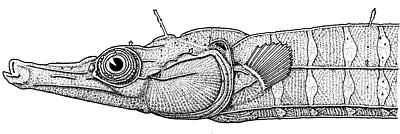
- Cosmocampus albirostris, from the Smithsonian Tropical Research Institute by Kevin Bryant

Conservation status
- Least Concern (IUCN 3.1)

Scientific classification
- Kingdom: Animalia
- Phylum: Chordata
- Class: Actinopterygii
- Order: Syngnathiformes
- Family: Syngnathidae
- Genus: Cosmocampus
- Species: C. albirostris

Binomial name
- Cosmocampus albirostris Kaup, 1856

Synonyms
- Corythoichthys albirostris Kaup, 1856; Corythoichthys brederi Parr, 1930; Siphostoma zatropis Jordan & Gilbert, 1882

= Cosmocampus albirostris =

White-nose pipefish

Species of fish

Cosmocampus albirostris (white-nose pipefish) is a marine fish of the family Syngnathidae. It is found in the western Atlantic Ocean, along the US coast from North Carolina to Florida, in the Gulf of Mexico, along the Yucatán Peninsula to Cuba, in the Caribbean from Puerto Rico to Grenada, and along Central and South America to southern Brazil. It lives among coral reefs, sea floor rubble, and sparse algae to depths of about 40 metres (130 ft), where it can grow to lengths of 20 centimetres (7.9 in). This species is ovoviviparous, with males carrying eggs in a brood pouch and giving birth to live young The Cosmocampus albirostris is a species of pipefish that has been historically collected in the State of Bahia. These species are in the Brazilian list of marine fishes that are authorized to be exported for ornamental purposes. This information was taken from a case study that monitored the ornamental trade of seahorses and pipefishes in Brazil, where harvesting of pipefish is common, and it was also discovered that Cosmocampus albirostris are predominantly harvested in reef areas.
