= Hypsoblennius maculipinna =

Conservation status
- Data Deficient (IUCN 3.1)

Scientific classification
- Kingdom: Animalia
- Phylum: Chordata
- Class: Actinopterygii
- Order: Blenniiformes
- Family: Blenniidae
- Genus: Hypsoblennius
- Species: H. maculipinna

Binomial name
- Hypsoblennius maculipinna (Regan, 1903)

Synonyms
- Chasmodes maculipinna Regan, 1903

Species of fish

Hypsoblennius maculipinna is a species of combtooth blenny, which is found in the shallow coastal waters of the eastern Pacific from Costa Rica to Ecuador and which usually measures about 6.2 centimetres (2.4 in).
