= Cosmocampus howensis =

Lord Howe pipefish

Conservation status
- Least Concern (IUCN 3.1)

Scientific classification
- Kingdom: Animalia
- Phylum: Chordata
- Class: Actinopterygii
- Order: Syngnathiformes
- Family: Syngnathidae
- Genus: Cosmocampus
- Species: C. howensis

Binomial name
- Cosmocampus howensis Whitley, 1948

Synonyms
- Parasyngnathus howensis Whitley, 1948; Syngnathus caldwelli Herald and Randall, 1972

Species of fish

Cosmocampus howensis (Lord Howe pipefish) is a species of marine fish of the family Syngnathidae. It is found in the South Pacific from Jervis Bay (New South Wales, Australia) to Easter Island. It lives in lagoons and on rocky reefs, where it grows to lengths of 10–12 centimetres (3.9–4.7 in). It is expected to feed on small crustaceans, similar to other pipefishes. This species is ovoviviparous, with males carrying eggs before giving birth to live young.

== Identifying features ==
This species has a blotchy brown body, occasionally marked with dark speckles and pale bars.
