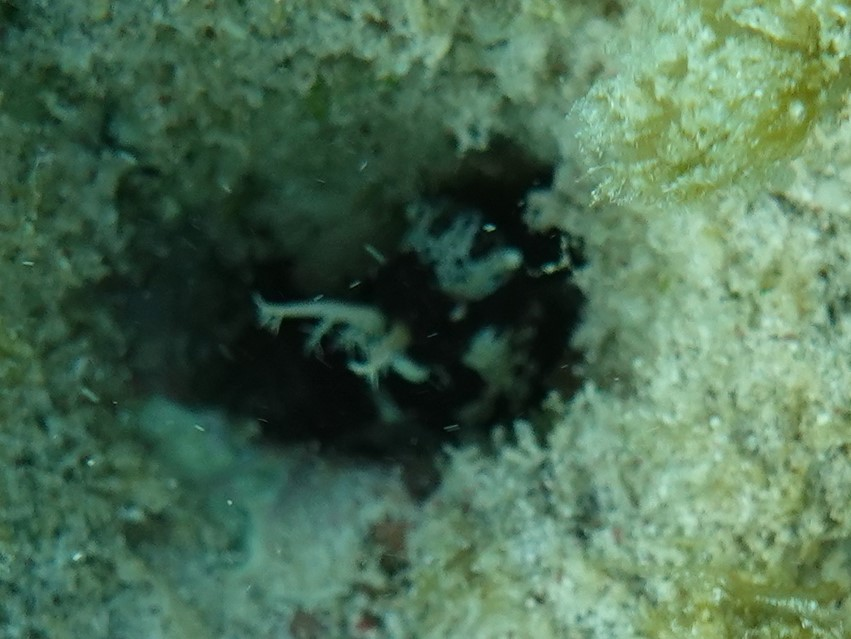

Conservation status
- Least Concern (IUCN 3.1)

Scientific classification
- Kingdom: Animalia
- Phylum: Chordata
- Class: Actinopterygii
- Order: Blenniiformes
- Family: Blenniidae
- Genus: Hypsoblennius
- Species: H. exstochilus

Binomial name
- Hypsoblennius exstochilus J. E. Böhlke, 1959

= Hypsoblennius exstochilus =

Species of fish

Hypsoblennius exstochilus, commonly known as the longhorn blenny, is a species of combtooth blenny found in the western-central Atlantic Ocean. This species grows to a length of 5 centimetres (2.0 in) TL.

Adults in this species tend to inhabit rocky shallow areas. This species also exhibits an oviparous life cycle with distinct partner mating.
