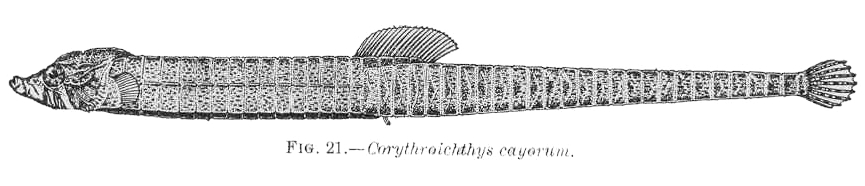

Conservation status
- Least Concern (IUCN 3.1)

Scientific classification
- Domain: Eukaryota
- Kingdom: Animalia
- Phylum: Chordata
- Class: Actinopterygii
- Order: Syngnathiformes
- Family: Syngnathidae
- Genus: Cosmocampus
- Species: C. brachycephalus

Binomial name
- Cosmocampus brachycephalus Poey, 1868

Synonyms
- Corythoichthys cayorum Evermann & Kendall, 1898; Syngnathus brachycephalus Poey, 1868

= Cosmocampus brachycephalus =

American crested pipefish

Species of fish

Cosmocampus brachycephalus (American crested pipefish) is a species of marine fish of the family Syngnathidae. It is found in the western Atlantic Ocean, near southern Florida (USA), the Bahamas, and northern South America. It lives in sub-tidal grass flats to depths of 10 metres (33 ft), where it can grow to lengths of 10 centimetres (3.9 in). This species ovoviviparous, with males carrying eggs and giving birth to live young.

== Identifying Features ==
This species can be distinguished by its prominent crest on top of its head, as well as its black stripes.
