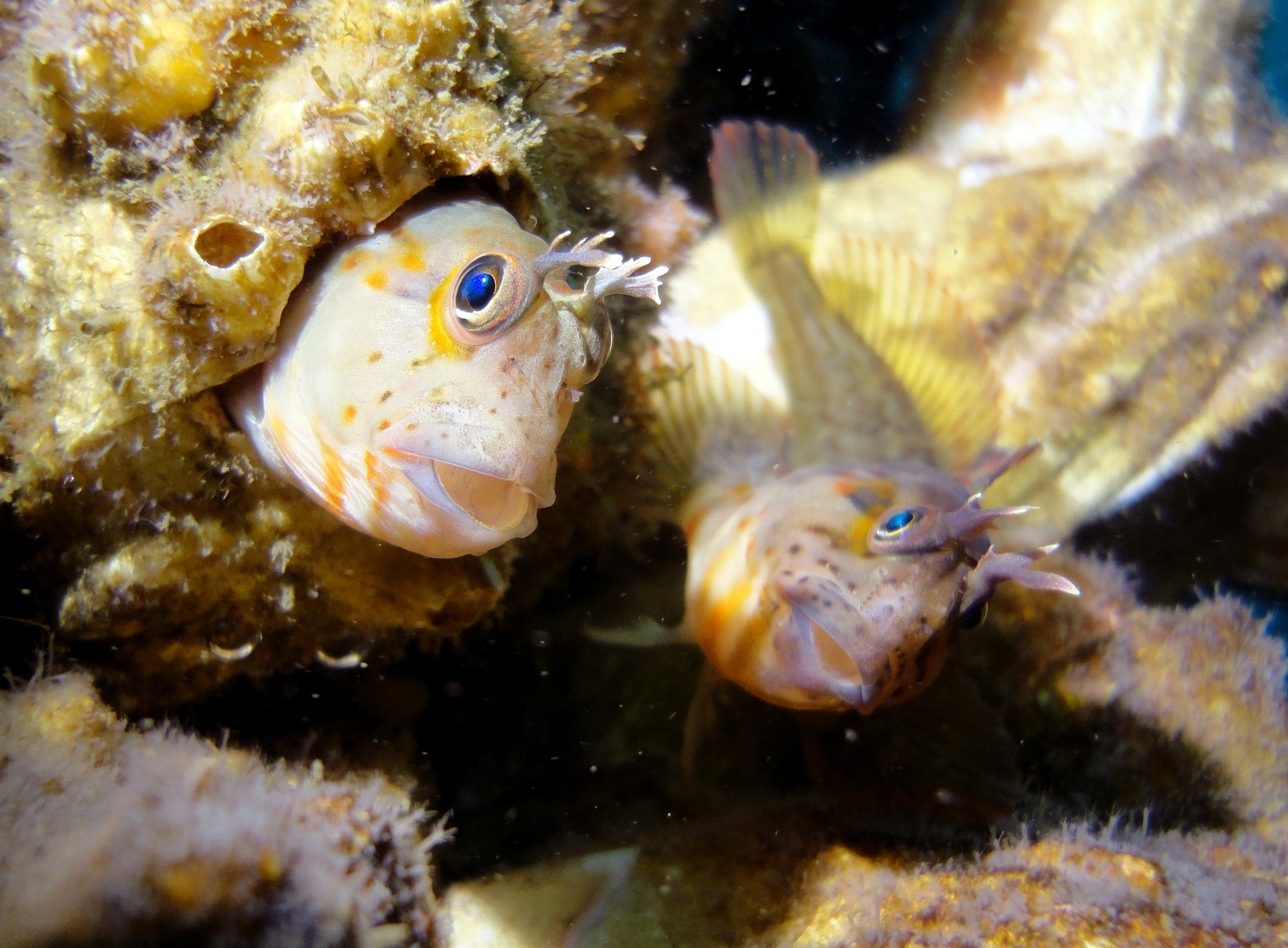

Conservation status
- Least Concern (IUCN 3.1)

Scientific classification
- Kingdom: Animalia
- Phylum: Chordata
- Class: Actinopterygii
- Order: Blenniiformes
- Family: Blenniidae
- Genus: Hypsoblennius
- Species: H. sordidus

Binomial name
- Hypsoblennius sordidus (E. T. Bennett, 1828)

Synonyms
- List: Blennius sordidus Bennett, 1828; Blennechis biocellatus Valenciennes, 1836; Blennechis fasciatus Jenyns, 1841; Blennechis ornatus Jenyns, 1841; Blennius nigrescens Sauvage, 1880; Salarias chilensis Clark, 1938; Blennius riverosi Fowler, 1951

= Hypsoblennius sordidus =

Species of fish

Hypsoblennius sordidus is a species of combtooth blenny found in the south-eastern Pacific Ocean, from Lima, Peru south to Chile. This species grows to a length of 11.6 centimetres (4.6 in) TL.
