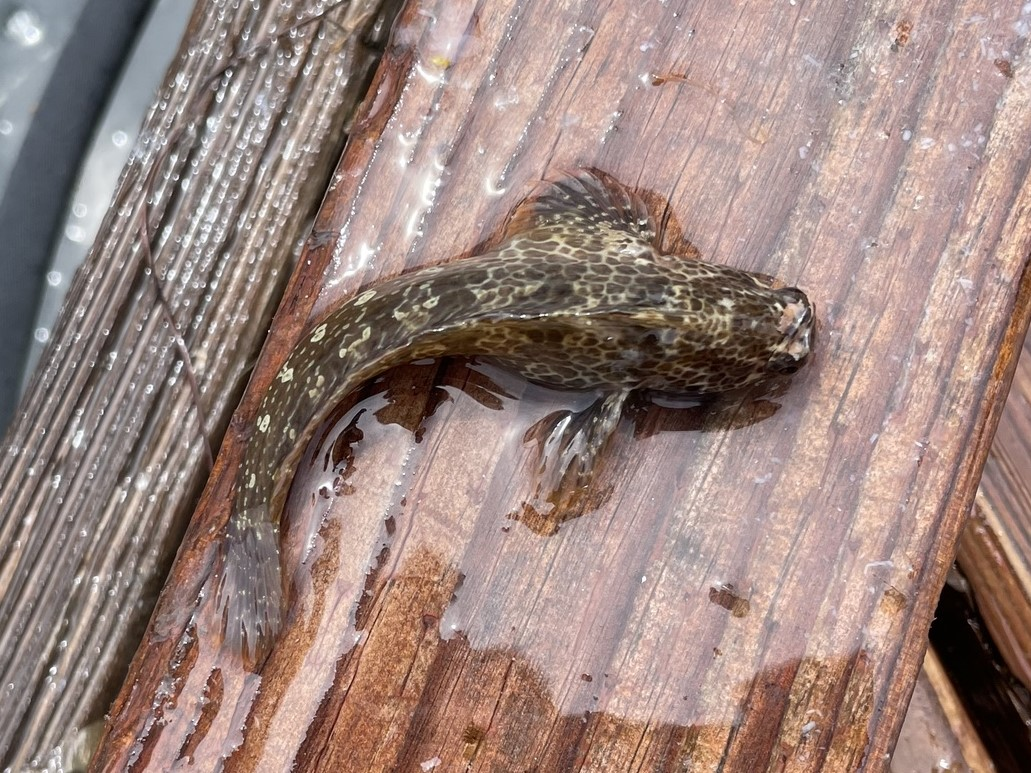

Conservation status
- Least Concern (IUCN 3.1)

Scientific classification
- Kingdom: Animalia
- Phylum: Chordata
- Class: Actinopterygii
- Order: Blenniiformes
- Family: Blenniidae
- Genus: Hypsoblennius
- Species: H. gentilis

Binomial name
- Hypsoblennius gentilis (Girard, 1854)

Synonyms
- Blennius gentilis Girard, 1854; Hypsoblennius digueti Chabanaud, 1943

= Hypsoblennius gentilis =

Species of fish

Hypsoblennius gentilis, commonly known as the bay blenny, is a species of combtooth blenny found in the eastern-central Pacific Ocean. This species grows to a length of 15 centimetres (5.9 in) TL.
