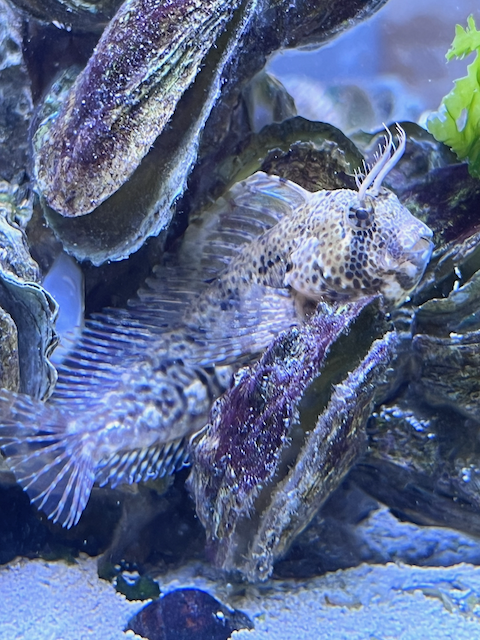
- feather blenny

Conservation status
- Least Concern (IUCN 3.1)

Scientific classification
- Kingdom: Animalia
- Phylum: Chordata
- Class: Actinopterygii
- Division: Teleostei
- Order: Blenniiformes
- Family: Blenniidae
- Genus: Hypsoblennius
- Species: H. hentz

Binomial name
- Hypsoblennius hentz (Lesueur, 1825)

Synonyms
- Blennius hentz Lesueur, 1825

= Hypsoblennius hentz =

Species of fish

Hypsoblennius hentz, commonly known as the feather blenny, is a species of combtooth blenny found on coral reefs in the western Atlantic Ocean. This species grows to a length of 10 centimetres (3.9 in) total length. The feather blenny is found from Nova Scotia, Canada to Texas along the shore of North America. Often, feather blennies can be found in oyster reefs and rocky shores. The identity of the person honoured in this species' specific name is uncertain but it is thought that to have been the French American arachnologist Nicholas Marcellus Hentz (1797-1856) who is the "Mr Hentz" from Charleston, North Carolina who sent the type to Lesueur.
