= Samuel Frederick Hildebrand =

American ichthyologist (1883–1949)

Samuel Frederick Hildebrand (August 15, 1883 – March 16, 1949) was an American ichthyologist.

== Life and work ==
Hildebrand was the son of German-born parents who immigrated to the United States in 1864. From 1908 to 1910 he worked as an assistant to Seth Eugene Meek at the Field Museum of Natural History in Chicago. In 1910 he received his Bachelor of Arts degree from Indiana State Normal School and became a research associate at the United States Bureau of Fisheries in Washington, D.C., where he remained until 1914. From 1910 to 1912 he undertook, with Meek, two collecting expeditions to Panama from which he published The Fishes of the Fresh Waters of Panama (1916) and The Marine Fishes of Panama (1923). From 1914 to 1918 he was head of the U.S. Fisheries Biological Station at Beaufort, North Carolina. In 1918 he studied mosquito control by small fish in Augusta, Georgia. From 1918 to 1919 he was director of the U.S. Fisheries Biological Station in Key West, Florida. From 1919 to 1925 he worked as an ichthyologist at the U.S. Bureau of Fisheries in Washington, D.C.

From 1920 to 1924 he was a consultant and investigator with the United States Public Health Service. In 1924 he went with the fish farmer Fred J. Foster on an expedition to Central America. From 1925 to 1931 he was again director of the U.S. Fisheries Biological Station, Beaufort, North Carolina. From 1931 to 1949 he worked as a senior ichthyologist at the Bureau of Fisheries. In 1935 and 1937 he made two further collecting expeditions to Panama. In 1949 the United States Department of the Interior posthumously honored him with its Distinguished Service Award.

Hildebrand's research focused on the life of turtles, mosquito control and the life of fish larvae, the early development of North American fish, studies on the Central American ichthyofauna, marine fishes in eastern North America, Panama and Peru, and revisions within the herring family. Furthermore, Hildebrand was involved in the standard work Fishes of the Western North Atlantic.

== Works (selection) ==
- The Fishes of the Fresh Waters of Panama, 1916 (with Seth Eugene Meek)
- The Marine Fishes of Panama, 1923 (with Seth Eugene Meek)
- Fishes of Chesapeake Bay, 1928 (with William Charles Schroeder)
- Cold-blooded Vertebrates: Part I. Fishes, 1930 (with Charles Whitney Gilmore & Doris Mable Cochran)
- Hildebrand, Samuel F.; Cable, Louella E. (1930). "Development and life history of fourteen teleostean fishes at Beaufort, N.C." Bulletin of the Bureau of Fisheries. 46: 383–488. Document no. 1093. (with Louella E. Cable)
- Hildebrand, Samuel F.; Cable, Louella E. (1938). "Further notes on the development and life history of some teleosts at Beaufort, N.C.". Bulletin (24). U.S. Bureau of Fisheries.
- A Descriptive Catalog of the Shore Fishes of Peru, 1946

== Taxon described by him ==
- See Category:Taxa named by Samuel Frederick Hildebrand

== Taxon named in his honor ==
- The dwarf pipefish Cosmocampus hildebrandi (Herald, 1965) was named for him.
