= Oliver Peebles Jenkins =

American physiologist and histologist

Oliver Peebles Jenkins (November 3, 1850 in Bantam, Ohio – January 9, 1935 in Palo Alto, California) was an American physiologist and histologist, mainly associated with Stanford University.

== Career ==
Jenkins graduated from Moores Hill College (now the University of Evansville) in 1869 and served as a teacher, high school principal and superintendent in the public school systems of Indiana, Wisconsin and California, returning to Moores Hill College in 1876 to take up a post as a professor. In 1883 he was appointed to the faculty of the Indiana State Normal School (now Indiana State University) at Terre Haute and he became Professor of Biology at DePauw University in 1886 where he remained until 1891. In that year he was appointed a founding faculty member at Stanford University and he remained there until he retired in 1916 when he was Professor Emeritus of Physiology.

He collected specimens on expeditions with David Starr Jordan and Barton Warren Evermann and he wrote works on the fishes of the United States of America and of Hawaii, as well as on invertebrate nervous systems. Jenkins also wrote a series of text books on physiology for Indiana State University. He was a founder member of the Indiana Academy of Science and its first treasurer. Among the many scientific societies he was a member of were the American Association for the Advancement of Science, the American Physiological Society and the Cooper Ornithological Society.

== Personal life ==
Jenkins was survived by his widow, Elizabeth, and their two sons.

== As a naturalist ==
Jenkins wrote a paper called Report on collections of fishes made in the Hawaiian Islands, with descriptions of new species for the Bulletin of the United States Fish Commission in 1903.

The combtooth blenny Hypsoblennius jenkinsi was named in honour Jenkins by David Starr Jordan and Barton Warren Evermann.
