= Earl S. Herald =

American zoologist (1914–1973)

Earl Stannard Herald (April 10, 1914 – January 16, 1973) was an American zoologist, ichthyologist and television presenter. He was born in Phoenix, Arizona, and got his Ph.D. in 1943. In 1948, he became the director of the Steinhart Aquarium in San Francisco, California, and from 1952 to 1966, he presented the popular science television programme Science in Action. Throughout his life, he studied a variety of aquatic organisms, especially pipefishes, and described many new taxa. He died in Cabo San Lucas, Baja California, in a scuba diving accident.

== Education and early career ==
Herald graduated as a Bachelor of Arts from the University of California, Los Angeles in 1937, he then completed his master's degree at the University of California, Berkeley in 1939 and then his Ph.D. at Stanford University in 1943. This selection of institutions allowed Herald to be schooled in zoology by Loye Holmes Miller and Joseph Grinnell, while his training as an ichthyologist was supervised by George S. Myers. He joined the United States Army during the Second World War and rose to the rank of captain in the Sanitary Corps. In 1946, he was an ichthyological investigator on the effects of the atomic bomb tests at Bikini Atoll had on reef fishes. In 1947 and 1948, he was appointed to the U.S. Fish and Wildlife Service's Philippine fishery program as an aquatic biologist.

== Steinhart Aquarium and California Academy of Sciences ==
Herald was appointed as Curator of Aquatic Biology at the Steinhart Aquarium in San Francisco on August 2, 1948. He expanded the Herpetological Exhibit at the Aquarium from a single boa to one of the world's leading exhibits of reptiles and amphibians. He also secured major funding for refurbishment and renewal of the Aquarium in the form of a San Francisco Municipal bond. In addition, he conceived of a doughnut-shaped exhibit which would allow for the display of fast swimming pelagic species, for which he also secured major funding.

In addition to his work in expanding and improving the Steinhart Aquarium he was also the presenter of the television show Science in Action, replacing the original host Dr Tom Groody, and he presented the show for the rest of its runs between 1952 and 1966, when the show ceased production. This was a half-hour weekly show, produced by the California Academy of Sciences, which was originally broadcast locally in the San Francisco Bay area but which was eventually shown all over the world. It contained discussions of science topics with noted scientists as well as a popular segment involving unpredictable animals. In one especially notable sequence Herald demonstrated the ability of archer fish Toxotes jaculatrix to shoot food from the walls of their aquarium having spent the previous weeks training the fish. Herald's interest in public education about science led him to propose a "San Francisco Bay floating laboratory" on a retired, refurbished PT boat, which was designed to allow High School pupils to observe marine biologists at work. He also instituted a graduate course on Aquatic Animals in Captivity for the California State University, San Francisco.

Herald was a Curator of the Department of Ichthyology at the California Academy of Sciences, as well as a Trustee of the George Vanderbilt Foundation, and in these roles he was able to secure funding to support the transfer of the Vanderbilt Foundation's collection of fishes from Stanford University to the academy, which also allowed for extensive renovations of the Department of Ichthyology. He was then involved in the transfer of Stanford University's collection of fishes and the David Starr Jordan Library to the academy.

== Research ==
Herald was primarily interested in fishes, especially pipefishes, and his initial dissertation was on the taxonomy of the American pipefishes. He was also interested in freshwater dolphins and travelled to the river systems which hold these species, he also travelled widely in his ichthyological research. In all he published 93 papers, many of which were on the systematics and biology of the Syngnathidae. He described many new taxa and some work was co-authored with John Ernest Randall and Charles Eric Dawson. During his life he published two books, the first of which, Living Fishes of the World, was translated into a number of languages. On his death, he was working on two additional books which were later published posthumously.

== Taxon named in his honor ==
His passion for pipefishes was recognised when the monotypic genus Heraldia and the species Cosmocampus heraldi were named in his honour. Additionally, the yellow angelfish (Centropyge heraldi), also known as Herald's angelfish, was named in his honour by his colleagues Loren Paul Woods and Leonard Peter Schultz, the type being collected with Herald's assistance during his time at Bikini Atoll.

== Taxon described by him ==
- See Category:Taxa named by Earl Stannard Herald

== Death and personal life ==
Herald died on 16 January 1973 while scuba diving off Cabo San Lucas in Baja California. He was searching for the golden angelfish Holocanthus clarionensis which had been reported by other divers in that area. He was survived by his wife Olivia and their three children, Bruce, Douglas and Katherine.

== Publications ==
The following is an incomplete list of publications authored by Earl Stannard Herald:

- 1940 A key to the pipefishes of the Pacific American coasts with descriptions of new genera and species University of Southern California Press
- 1943 Studies on the classification and interrelationships of the American pipefishes Dissertation Ph.D. Stanford University
- 1953 Fishes of the Marshall and Marianas islands. Vol. I. Families from Asymmetrontidae through Siganidae. Bulletin of the United States National Museum No. 202, v. 1: i-xxxii + 1–685, Pls. 1-74. with L.P. Schultz, E. A. Lachner, A. D. Welander and L. P. Woods
- 1959 From pipefish to seahorse; a study of phylogenetic relationships. Proceedings of the California Academy of Sciences, 4th ser., v. 29, no. 13
- 1961 Living Fishes of the World Doubleday, New York ISBN 0385009887
- 1965 Studies on the Atlantic American pipefishes, with descriptions of new species. California Academy of Sciences, San Francisco.
- 1972 Fishes of North America Doubleday, New York ISBN 038505596X
- 1983 A field guide to Pacific Coast fishes : North America with William N. Eschmeyer, Houghton Mifflin, Boston part of the Peterson Field Guide series ISBN 061800212X
