= Evolution of the wolf =

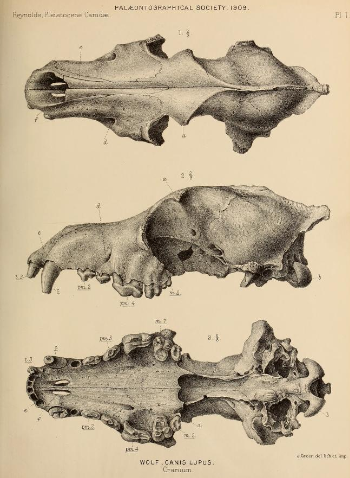
Illustration of a Pleistocene wolf cranium that was found in Kents Cavern, Torquay, England

It is widely agreed that the evolutionary lineage of the grey wolf can be traced back 2 million years to the Early Pleistocene species Canis etruscus, and its successor the Middle Pleistocene Canis mosbachensis. The grey wolf Canis lupus is a highly adaptable species that is able to exist in a range of environments and which possesses a wide distribution across the Holarctic. Studies of modern grey wolves have identified distinct sub-populations that live in close proximity to each other. This variation in sub-populations is closely linked to differences in habitat – precipitation, temperature, vegetation, and prey specialization – which affect cranio-dental plasticity.

The earliest specimens of the modern grey wolf date to around 400,000 years ago, or possibly earlier to 1 million years ago. Most modern wolves share most of their common ancestry within the last 25-23,000 years from earlier Siberian wolf populations. While some sources have suggested that this is the result of a population bottleneck, others suggest that this is a normal consequence of gene flow homogenising wolf genomes across their range.

== Fossil record ==
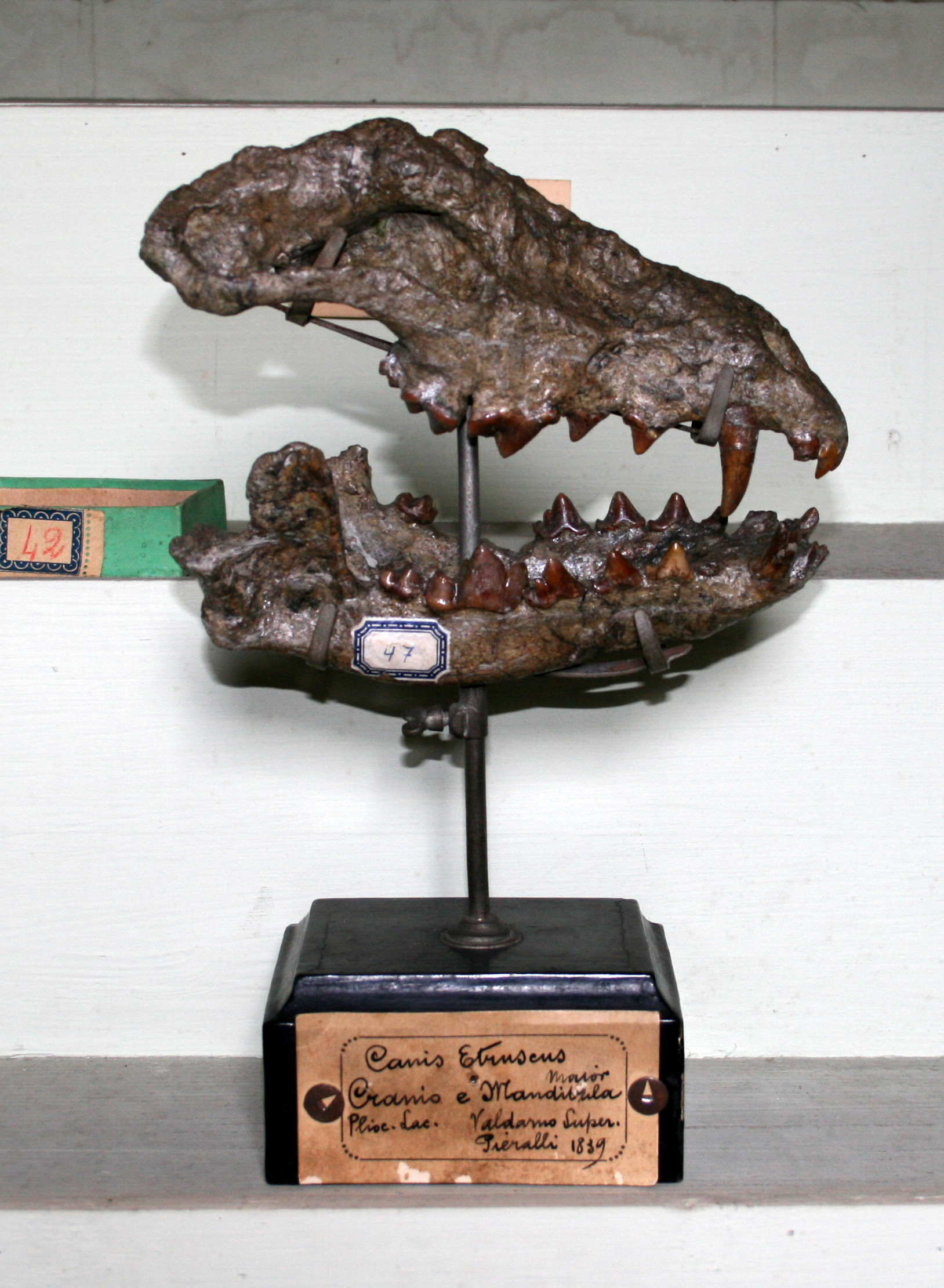
Canis etruscus skull in the Montevarchi Paleontological Museum

The fossil record for ancient vertebrates is composed of rarely occurring fragments from which it is often impossible to obtain genetic material. Researchers are limited to morphologic analysis but it is difficult to estimate the intra-species and inter-species variations and relationships that existed between specimens across time and place. Some observations are debated by researchers who do not always agree, and hypotheses that are supported by some authors are challenged by others.

The Cretaceous–Paleogene extinction event occurred 66 million years ago and brought an end to the non-avian dinosaurs and the appearance of the first carnivorans. The name carnivoran is given to a member of the order Carnivora. Carnivorans possess a common arrangement of teeth called carnassials, in which the first lower molar and the last upper premolar possess blade-like enamel crowns that act similar to a pair of shears for cutting meat. This dental arrangement has been modified by adaptation over the past 60 million years for diets composed of meat, for crushing vegetation, or for the loss of the carnassial function altogether as in seals, sea lions, and walruses. Today, not all carnivorans are carnivores, such as the insect-eating aardwolf.

The carnivoran ancestors of the dog-like caniforms and the cat-like feliforms began their separate evolutionary paths just after the end of the dinosaurs. The first members of the dog family Canidae appeared 40 million years ago, of which only its subfamily the Caninae survives today in the form of the wolf-like and fox-like canines. The caniforms included the fox-like genus Leptocyon whose various species existed from 34 million YBP before branching 11.9 million YBP into Vulpes (foxes) and Canini (canines). The jackal-sized Eucyon existed in North America from 10 million YBP and by the Early Pliocene about 6–5 million YBP the coyote-like Eucyon davisi invaded Eurasia. In North America it gave rise to early Canis which first appeared in the Miocene (6 million YBP) in south-western US and Mexico. By 5 million YBP the larger Canis lepophagus appeared in the same region.

The canids that had immigrated from North America to Eurasia – Eucyon, Vulpes, and Nyctereutes – were small to medium-sized predators during the Late Miocene and Early Pliocene but they were not the top predators. The position of the canids would change with the arrival of Canis to become a dominant predator across the Holarctic. The wolf-sized C. chihliensis appeared in northern China in the Mid-Pliocene around 4–3 million YBP. The large wolf-sized Canis appeared in the Middle Pliocene about 3 million years ago in the Yushe Basin, Shanxi Province, China. By 2.5 million years ago its range included the Nihewan Basin in Yangyuan County, Hebei, China and Kuruksay, Tadzhikistan. This was followed by an explosion of Canis evolution across Eurasia in the Early Pleistocene around 1.8 million YBP in what is commonly referred to as the wolf event. It is associated with the formation of the mammoth steppe and continental glaciation. Canis spread to Europe in the forms of C. arnensis, C. etruscus, and C. falconeri. Other studies state that the oldest Canis remains that have been found in Europe were from France and dated to 3.1 million YBP, followed by Canis cf. etruscus (where cf. in Latin means confer, uncertain) from Italy dated to 2.2 million YBP.

The fossil record is incomplete but it is likely that wolves arose from a population of small, early canids. Morphological evidence and genetic evidence both suggest that wolves evolved during the Pliocene and Early Pleistocene eras from the same lineage that also led to the coyote, with fossil specimens indicating that the coyote and the wolf diverged from a common ancestor 1.5 million years ago. The ancestor of the jackal and the other extant members of the genus Canis had split from the lineage before this time.

After this separation from a common ancestor the species that were believed to be involved in the further evolution of the wolf and coyote – and the beliefs of some paleontologists – diverged. A number of researchers believed that the lines of C. priscolatrans, C. etruscus, C. rufus, C. lycaon, and C. lupus were components involved in some way that lead to the modern wolf and coyote.

Wolf evolution

- †Canis lepophagus
  - Canis latrans (Coyote)
  - †Canis priscolatrans
    - extinct taxa
    - †Canis armbrusteri
      - †Canis dirus (Dire wolf)
      - †Canis nehringi
      - †Canis gezi
  - †Canis etruscus
    - †Canis variabilis
    - †Canis mosbachensis
      - Canis rufus (red wolf)
      - Canis lupus (grey wolf)
      - Canis familiaris (dog)

Proposed evolution and branching of genus Canis towards the wolf.

=== Canis lepophagus ===
Canis lepophagus lived in the early Pliocene in North America. Kurten proposed that the Blancan C. lepophagus derived from smaller Miocene Canis species in North America. It then became widespread across Eurasia where it was either identical to, or closely related with, C. arnensis of Europe.

Johnston describes C. lepophagus as having a more slender skull and skeleton than in the modern coyote. Robert M. Nowak found that the early populations had small, delicate and narrowly proportioned skulls that resemble small coyotes and appear to be ancestral to C. latrans. Johnson noted that some specimens found in Cita Canyon, Texas, had larger, broader skulls, and along with other fragments Nowak suggested that these were evolving into wolves.

Tedford disagreed with previous authors and found that its cranio-dental morphology lacked some characteristics that are shared by C. lupus and C. latrans, and therefore there was not a close relationship but it did suggest C. lepophagus was the ancestor of both wolves and coyotes.

=== Canis armbrusteri ===
The North American wolves became larger, with tooth specimens indicating that C. priscolatrans diverged into the large wolf C. armbrusteri. during the Middle Pleistocene in North America. Robert A. Martin disagreed, and believed that C. armbrusteri was C. lupus. Nowak disagreed with Martin and proposed that C. armbrusteri was not related to C. lupus but C. priscolatrans, which then gave rise to A. dirus. Tedford proposed that the South American C. gezi and C. nehringi share dental and cranial similarities developed for hypercarnivory, suggesting C. armbrusteri was the common ancestor of C. gezi, C. nehringi and A. dirus.

=== Aenocyon dirus ===
In 1908 the paleontologist John Campbell Merriam began retrieving numerous fossilized bone fragments of a large wolf from the Rancho La Brea tar pits. By 1912 he had found a skeleton sufficiently complete to be able to formally recognize these and the previously found specimens under the name C. dirus (Leidy 1858).

Canis dirus, or as it is now widely recognized, Aenocyon dirus, lived in the late Pleistocene to early Holocene in North and South America. In 1987, a new hypothesis proposed that a mammal population could give rise to a larger form called a hypermorph during times when food was abundant, but when food later became scarce the hypermorph would either adapt to a smaller form or go extinct. This hypothesis might explain the large body sizes found in many Late Pleistocene mammals compared to their modern counterparts. Both extinction and speciation – a new species splitting from an older one – could occur together during periods of climatic extremes. Gloria D. Goulet agreed with Martin and further proposed that this hypothesis might explain the sudden appearance of A. dirus in North America, and that because of the similarities in their skull shapes that C. lupus gave rise to the A. dirus hypermorph due to abundant game, a stable environment, and large competitors. Nowak, Kurten and Berta disagreed with Goulet and proposed that A. dirus was not derived from C. lupus. The three noted paleontologists Xiaoming Wang, R. H. Tedford and R. M. Nowak have all proposed that A. dirus had evolved from C. armbrusteri, with Nowak stating that there were specimens from Cumberland Cave, Maryland, that indicated C. armbrusteri diverging into A. dirus. The two taxa share a number of characteristics (synapomorphy), which suggests an origin of A. dirus in the late Irvingtonian in the open terrain in the midcontinent, and then later expanding eastward and displacing its ancestor C. armbrusteri.

However, in 2021, a study indicated the dire wolf to be a highly divergent lineage which last shared a most recent common ancestor with the wolf-like canines 5.7 million years ago. The morphological similarity between dire wolves and gray wolves was concluded to be due to convergent evolution. This finding indicates that the wolf and coyote lineages evolved in isolation from the dire wolf lineage. The study proposes an early origin of the dire wolf lineage in the Americas, and that this geographic isolation allowed them to develop a degree of reproductive isolation since their divergence 5.7 million years ago. Coyotes, dholes, gray wolves, and the extinct Xenocyon evolved in Eurasia and expanded into North America relatively recently during the Late Pleistocene, therefore there was no admixture with the dire wolf. As a result, the study found that the correct binomial name of the dire wolf is Aenocyon dirus, as proposed by Merriam in 1918. The long-term isolation of the dire wolf lineage implies that other American fossil taxa, including C. armbrusteri and C. edwardii, may also belong to the dire wolf's lineage.

=== Canis chihliensis ===
Wolf evolution – alternate proposal

- †Eucyon davisi
  - †Canis lepophagus
    - extinct taxa
    - †Canis edwardii
      - Canis aureus (Golden jackal)
      - Canis latrans (coyote)
  - †Canis chihliensis
    - †Canis armbrusteri
      - †Canis dirus
      - †Canis nehringi
      - †Canis gezi
    - Canis lupus
      - Grey wolf
      - Domestic dog
    - †Canis falconeri
      - - Extinct taxa
      - †Xenocyon
        - Cuon (Dhole)
        - Lycaon (African hunting dog)

Previously proposed evolution and branching from Eucyon towards the wolf (2008).

Wang and Tedford proposed that the genus Canis was the descendant of the coyote-like Eucyon davisi, and its remains first appeared in the Miocene (6 million YBP) in south-western USA and Mexico. By the Pliocene (5 million YBP), the larger Canis lepophagus appeared in the same region and by the Early Pleistocene (1 million YBP) Canis latrans (the coyote) was in existence. They proposed that the progression from Eucyon davisi to C lepophagus to the coyote was linear evolution. Additionally, C. edwardii, C. latrans and C. aureus form together a small clade and because C. edwardii appeared earliest spanning the mid-Blancan (late Pliocene) to the close of the Irvingtonian (late Pleistocene) it is proposed as the ancestor.

Nowak and Tedford also believed that it was possible for C. lupus to have been derived from a Miocene or Pliocene canid line that preceded and was separate from C. lepophagus. Based on morphology from China, the Pliocene wolf C. chihliensis may have been the ancestor for both C. armbrusteri and C. lupus before their migration into North America. C. chihliensis appears to be more primitive and smaller than C. lupus, and measurements of its skull and teeth are similar to C. lupus but those of its postcranial elements are smaller. C. armbrusteri appeared in North America in the Middle Pleistocene and is a wolf-like form larger than any Canis at that time. At the end of the most recent glacial retreat during the past 30,000 years, warming melted the glacial barriers across northern Canada allowing arctic mammals to extend their range into mid-latitude North America, including elk, caribou, bison, and the grey wolf.

In Eurasia during the Middle Pleistocene, C. falconeri gave rise to the hypercarnivore genus Xenocyon, which then gave rise to genus Cuon (the dhole) and genus Lycaon (the African hunting dog). Just before the appearance of C. dirus, North America was invaded by genus Xenocyon that was as large as C. dirus and more hypercarnivorous. The fossil record shows them as rare and it is assumed that they could not compete with the newly derived C. dirus.

==== Canis antonii ====
The large wolf C. antonii from late Pliocene to early Pleistocene China was assessed as being a variation within C. chihliensis, and the large wolf C. falconeri occurred abruptly in Europe in the Early Pleistocene, perhaps representing a westward extension of C. antonii.

=== Canis borjgali ===
In 2020, researchers named a new species C. borjgali that was found in Dmanisi, Georgia in a site dated 1.8—1.75 million years ago. This specimen did not show the peculiarities of C. etruscus but appears to be closer to a primitive form of C. mosbachensis and is proposed as the ancestor of C. mosbachensis. The wolf C. borjgali is probably the ancestor of the wolf-like crown-clade species C. lupus, C. latrans, and C. lupaster.

=== Canis mosbachensis ===
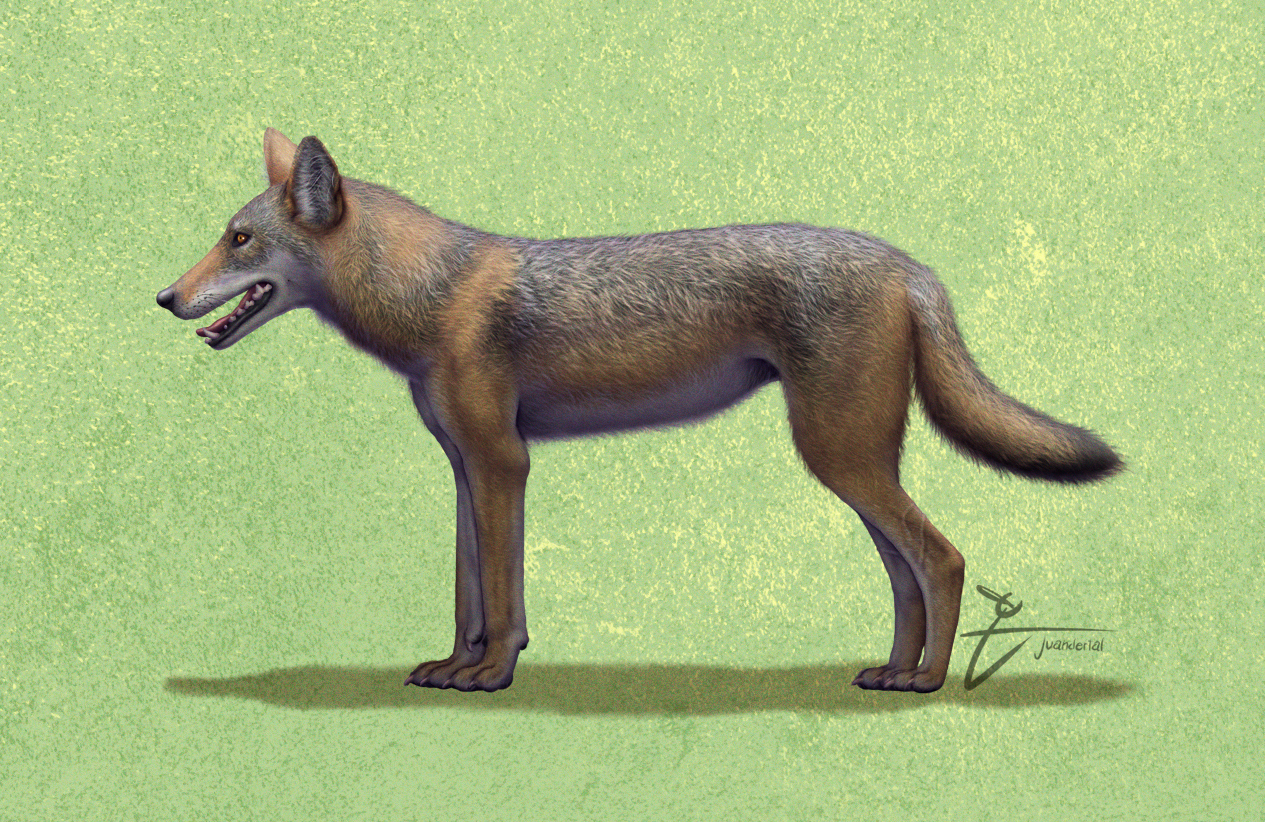
Life restoration of C. mosbachensis

Canis mosbachensis, sometimes known as the Mosbach wolf, is an extinct small wolf that once inhabited Eurasia from the Middle to Late Pleistocene. The phylogenetic descent of the extant wolf C. lupus from C. etruscus through C. mosbachensis is widely accepted. In 2010, a study found that the diversity of the Canis group decreased by the end of the Early Pleistocene to Middle Pleistocene and was limited in Eurasia to the small wolves of the C. mosbachensis–C. variabilis group that were a comparable size to the extant Indian wolf (Canis lupus pallipes), and the large hypercarnivorous Canis (Xenocyon) lycanoides that was comparable in size to extant northern grey wolves.

=== Canis lupus ===
The earliest Canis lupus specimen was a fossil tooth discovered at Old Crow, Yukon, Canada. The specimen was found in sediment dated 1 million YBP, however the geological attribution of this sediment is questioned. Slightly younger specimens were discovered at Cripple Creek Sump, Fairbanks, Alaska, in strata dated 810,000 YBP. Both discoveries point to an origin of these wolves in east Beringia during the Middle Pleistocene.

In France, the subspecies C. l. lunellensis Bonifay, 1971 discovered at Lunel-Viel, Hérault dated 400–350,000 YBP, C. l. santenaisiensis Argant, 1991 from Santenay, Côte-d'Or dated to 200,000 YBP, and C. lupus maximus Boudadi-Maligne, 2012 from Jaurens cave, Nespouls, Corrèze dated 31,000 YBP, show a progressive increase in size and are proposed to be chrono-subspecies. In Italy, the earliest Canis lupus specimens were found at La Polledrara di Cecanibbio, 20 km north-west of Rome in strata dated 340,000–320,000 YBP. In 2017, a study found that the dimensions of the upper and lower carnassial teeth of the early Holocene Italian wolf are close to those of C. l. maximus. Fluctuations in the size of C. lupus carnassial teeth correlate with the spread of megafauna. The Italian wolf underwent a reduction in body size with the loss of the red deer in Italy during the Renaissance. The proposed lineage is:

C. etruscus → C. mosbachensis → C. l. lunellensis → C. l. santenaisiensis → C. l. maximus → C. l. lupus

==== Canis lupus bohemica ====
In 2022, a new subspecies Canis lupus bohemica was taxonomically described after having been discovered in the Bat Cave system located near Srbsko, Central Bohemia, Czech Republic. The Bohemian wolf is an extinct short-legged wolf that first appeared 800,000 years ago (MIS 20, the Rhumian Interglacial of the early Cromerian stage, Middle Pleistocene) and once inhabited what was part of the mammoth steppe. It is proposed as the ancestor of Canis lupus mosbachensis. In comparison, C. etruscus appears to be the ancestor of the Afro-Eurasian jackal.

In Hungary in 1969, a tooth (the premolar of the Maxilla) was found which dated to the Middle Pleistocene, and was assessed as being midway between that of Canis mosbachensis and the cave wolf Canis lupus spelaeus, but leaning towards C.l. spelaeus. During the late Middle Pleistocene around 600,000 years ago, the Bohemian wolf diversified into two wolf lineages that specialized for different environmental and climatic conditions. One was a southern interglacial (warm climate) grey wolf of Europe which was to become the Mosbach wolf, and the other a northern glacial white wolf of Eurasia which was to become C. l. spelaeus.

=== Canis c.f. familiaris - Paleolithic dog ===
There are a number of recently discovered specimens which are proposed as being Paleolithic dogs, however their taxonomy is debated. These have been found in either Europe or Siberia and date 40,000-17,000 YBP. They include Hohle Fels in Germany, Goyet Caves in Belgium, Predmosti in the Czech Republic, and four sites in Russia: Razboinichya Cave, Kostyonki-8, Ulakhan Sular, and Eliseevichi 1. Paw-prints from Chauvet Cave in France dated 26,000 YBP are suggested as being those of a dog, however these have been challenged as being left by a wolf. Paleolithic dogs were directly associated with human hunting camps in Europe over 30,000 (YBP) and it is proposed that they were domesticated. They are also proposed to be either a proto-dog and the ancestor of the domestic dog or a type of wolf unknown to science.

=== Canis familiaris (domestic dog) ===
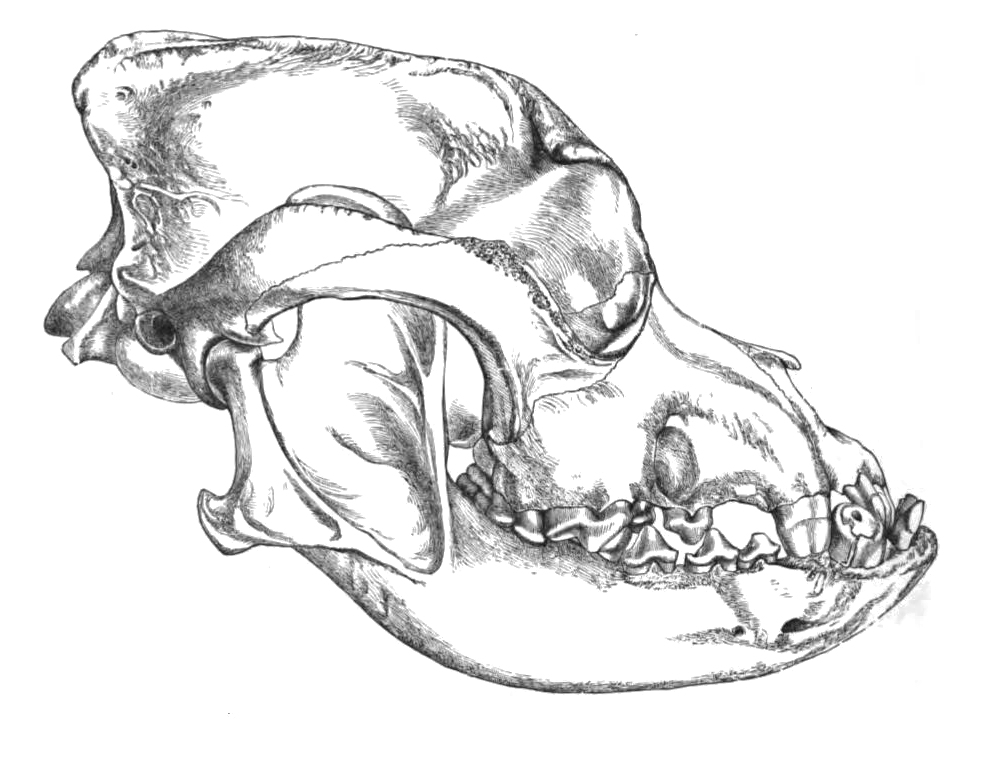
Bulldog skull – sketch

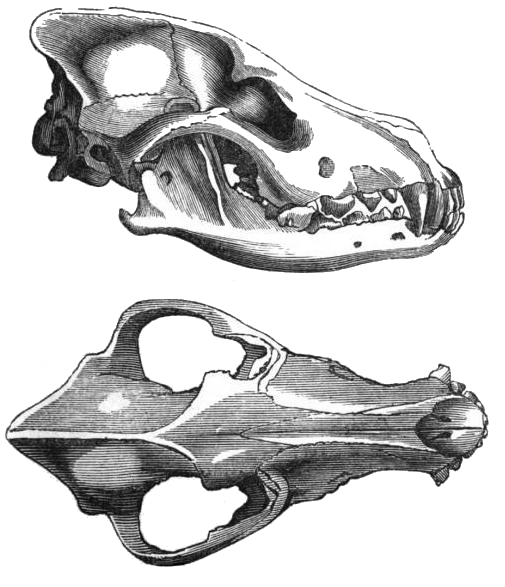
European wolf skull – sketch

Canis lupus skull: 1 – maxilla, 2 – frontal, 3 – lachrymal, 4 – palatine, 5 – jugal, 6 – nasal, 7 – premaxilla, 8 – parietal, 9 – interparietal, 10 – squamosal, 11 – occipital, 12 – mandible

In 2002, a study was undertaken into the fossil skulls of two large canids that had been found buried within meters of the doorway of what was once a mammoth-bone hut at the Eliseevichi-I Upper Paleolithic site in the Bryansk Region on the Russian Plain, and using an accepted morphologically based definition of domestication declared them to be "Ice Age dogs". The carbon dating gave a calendar-year age estimate that ranged between 16,945 and 13,905 YBP. In 2013, a study looked at one of these skulls and its mitochondrial DNA sequence was identified as Canis familiaris.

In 2015, a zooarchaeologist stated that "In terms of phenotypes, dogs and wolves are fundamentally different animals."

In 1986, a study of skull morphology found that the domestic dog is morphologically distinct from all other canids except the wolf-like canids. "The difference in size and proportion between some breeds are as great as those between any wild genera, but all dogs are clearly members of the same species." In 2010, a study of dog skull shape compared to extant carnivorans proposed that "The greatest shape distances between dog breeds clearly surpass the maximum divergence between species in the Carnivora. Moreover, domestic dogs occupy a range of novel shapes outside the domain of wild carnivorans."

==== Comparison with modern wolves ====
The domestic dog compared to the modern wolf shows the greatest variation in the size and shape of the skull (Evans 1979) that range from 7 to 28 cm in length (McGreevy 2004). Wolves are dolichocephalic (long skulled) but not as extreme as some breeds of such as greyhounds and Russian wolfhounds (McGreevy 2004). Canine brachycephaly (short-skulledness) is found only in domestic dogs and is related to paedomorphosis (Goodwin 1997). Puppies are born with short snouts, with the longer skull of dolichocephalic dogs emerging in later development (Coppinger 1995). Other differences in head shape between brachycephalic and dolichocephalic dogs include changes in the craniofacial angle (angle between the basilar axis and hard palate) (Regodón 1993), morphology of the temporomandibular joint (Dickie 2001), and radiographic anatomy of the cribriform plate (Schwarz 2000).

Nowak indicated that orbital angle of the eye socket is an important characteristic defining the difference between the dog and the wolf, with the wolf having the lower angle. Nowak compared the orbital angles of four North American canines (including the Indian dog) and produced the following values in degrees: coyote-42.8, wolf-42.8, dog-52.9 dire wolf-53.1. The orbital angle of the eye socket was clearly larger in the dog than in the coyote and the wolf; why it was almost the same as that of the dire wolf was not commented on.

Many authors have concluded that compared to the adult extant wolf, the adult domestic dog has a relatively reduced rostrum (front part of the skull), an elevated frontal bone, a wider palate, a broader cranium, and smaller teeth (Hildebrand1954; Clutton-Brock, Corbet & Hills 1976; Olsen 1985; Wayne 1986; Hemmer 1990; Morey 1990). Other authors have disagreed and have stated that these traits can overlap and vary within the two (Crockford 1999; Harrison 1973). Wolf cubs have similar relative skull proportions as adult dogs and this was proposed as evidence that the domestic dog is a neotenic wolf. This was proposed to be due to either human selection for juvenile appearance or due to a pleiotropic effect as a result of selection for juvenile behavior (Clutton-Brock 1977; Belyaev 1979; Wayne 1986; Coppinger and Schneider 1995). Wayne (1986) concluded that his dog samples did not have significant relative shortening of the rostrum compared to wolves, calling this identifying feature into question. A 2004 study that used 310 wolf skulls and over 700 dog skulls representing 100 breeds concluded that the evolution of dog skulls can generally not be described by heterochronic processes such as neoteny although some pedomorphic dog breeds have skulls that resemble the skulls of juvenile wolves. "Dogs are not paedomorphic wolves."

Compared to the wolf, dog dentition is relatively less robust (Olsen 1985; Hemmer 1990), which is proposed to be due to the relaxation of natural selection when wolves became commensal scavengers, or to artificial selection (Olsen 1985; Clutton-Brock 1995). However, Kieser and Groeneveld (1992) compared the mandibulo-dental measurements of jackals (C. adustus, C. mesomelas) and Cape foxes (Vulpes chama) to equivalent-sized dogs and found that the canines of these other canids tended to be slightly smaller and their second molars larger compared to dogs, otherwise the proportions were essentially the same in all species. They concluded that "...the teeth of canids appear to have evolved in concert with one another and relatively independently of differences in dimorphism, size or functional demands". This calls into question the assumption that dog teeth are relatively small due to recent selection, suggesting that dog dentition is plesiomorphic from an ancestor that was smaller than the wolf.

The reduced body size of the early dog compared to a wolf is thought due to niche selection (Olsen 1985; Morey 1992; Coppinger & Coppinger 2001). Morey (1992:199) states that "Results...are consistent with a hypothesis that early domestic dogs are evolutionary paedomorphs, products of strong selection for ontogenetically channeled size reduction and alterations of reproductive timing associated with the new domestic way of life." However, in a domestication experiment the domesticated foxes remained the same size as unselected foxes (Trutt 1999:167).

Wayne (1986) concluded that the dog is closer in skull morphology to C. latrans, C. aureus, C. adustus, C. mesomelas, Cuon alpinus and Lycaon pictus than to the wolf. Dahr (1942) concluded that the shape of the dog brain case is closer to that of the coyote than to that of the wolf. Manwell and Baker (1983) reviewed Dahr's work with the addition of dental data for canids and concluded that the dog ancestor was probably within the range of 13.6–20.5 kg, which is smaller than the range 27–54 kg for extant wolves (Mech 1970) and is comparable with the Dingo.

The auditory bulla of the dog is relatively smaller and flatter than that of the wolf (Harrison 1973; Clutton-Brock, Corbet & Hill 1976; Nowak 1979; Olsen 1985; Wayne 1986), which is proposed to be due to relaxed selection under domestication as the dog no longer required the acute hearing of the wolf. However, bulla shape has been shown to facilitate increased sensitivity to specific frequencies but shape and size may not be correlated with acuity (Ewer 1973). Therefore, the observed difference could be that the dog bulla has retained its ancestral shape.

The ventral edge of the dog's horizontal ramus of the mandible has a convex curve that does not exist in the wolf (Olsen 1985; Clutton-Brock 1995), and no discussion of this difference could be found in the literature. However, Biknevicius and Van Valkenburgh (1997) noticed that the horizontal ramus of bone-processing predators is thicker dorso-ventrally at the point caudal to the site of bone processing. This thickening may have been a function for niche adaptation by the dog's ancestor.

A description of the superficial brain morphology of jackals (C. mesomelas, C. aureus), coyotes (C. latrans), wolves (C. lupus, C. rufus), and dogs indicated that the cerebellum of the dog closely approximates that of the coyote, which is closely aligned with the jackals, and that the wolves show numerous brain traits distinct from the other species (Atkins and Dillon 1971). Wolves also have serological and biochemical traits distinct from dogs (Leone and Wiens 1956; Lauer, Kuyt & Baker 1969).

The tails of domestic dogs tend to curl upwards, which is not found in other canid. Dogs possess a domed forehead, which is easy to see in a profile view with a bulge above the orbit (the bony socket) of the eye. The temporalis muscle that closes the jaws is more robust in wolves. Compared with equally sized wolves, dogs possess 20% smaller skulls, and compared with equally weighted wolves dogs possess 20% smaller brains. The tympanic bullae are large, convex, and almost spherical in wolves, while the bullae of dogs are smaller, compressed, and slightly crumpled. Dogs have a distinctive "stop" between the forehead and nose. Domestic dogs are distinguishable from wolves by starch gel electrophoresis of red blood cell acid phosphatase.

During the Last Glacial Maximum, there was greater wolf genetic diversity than there is today, and within the Pleistocene grey wolf population the variations between local environments would have encouraged a range of wolf ecotypes that were genetically, morphologically and ecologically distinct from one another. One author has proposed that the most likely explanation for the different morphological characteristics of the dog compared to the wolf is that the dog's ancestor was adapted to a different niche than the wolf.

== Genetic record ==
=== DNA sequences ===
The mitochondria within each cell contain many copies of a small circular DNA genome and in mammals it is 16,000–18,000 base pairs in length. A cell contains hundreds or thousands of mitochondria and therefore the genes contained within those mitochondria are more abundant than the genes that occur in the nucleus of the cell. The abundance of mitochondrial DNA (mDNA) is useful for the genetic analysis of ancient remains where the DNA has degraded.

Mitochondrial DNA sequences have a higher mutation rate than the mutation rate of nuclear genes and for mammals this rate is 5–10 times faster. The mitochondrial protein-coding genes evolve much faster and are powerful markers for inferring evolution history at category levels such as families, genera, and species. However, they have evolved at a faster rate than other DNA markers and there is a timing difference in its molecular clock that needs to be validated against other sources. The taxonomic status of uncertain species is better resolved through using nuclear DNA from the nucleus of the cell, which is more suitable for analyzing the recent history. In most cases, mDNA is inherited from the maternal ancestor. Therefore, phylogenetic analysis of mDNA sequences within species provides a history of maternal lineages that can be represented as a phylogenetic tree.

From specimen to phylogenetic tree
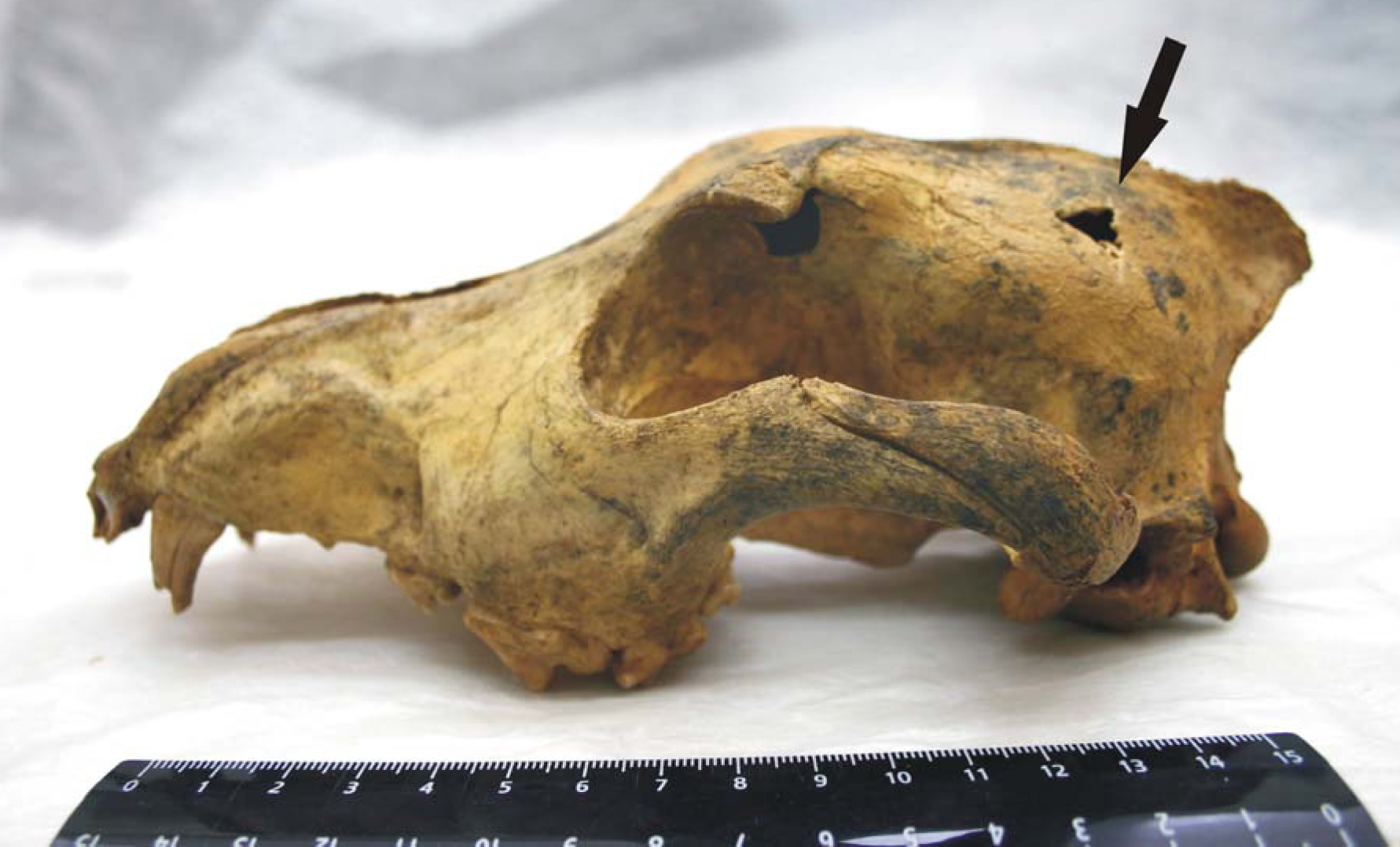
The 33,500 year old skull of the "Altai dog"

Location of nuclear DNA within the chromosomes of a cell nucleus

The structure of part of a DNA double helix

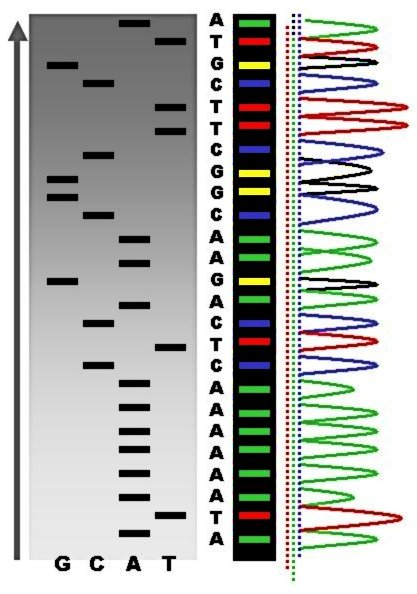
The results of DNA sequencing listing the DNA molecule's nucleobases (coded as G, C, A or T)

DNA molecule 1 differs from DNA molecule 2 at a single base pair location, called a single-nucleotide polymorphism (a SNP mutation)

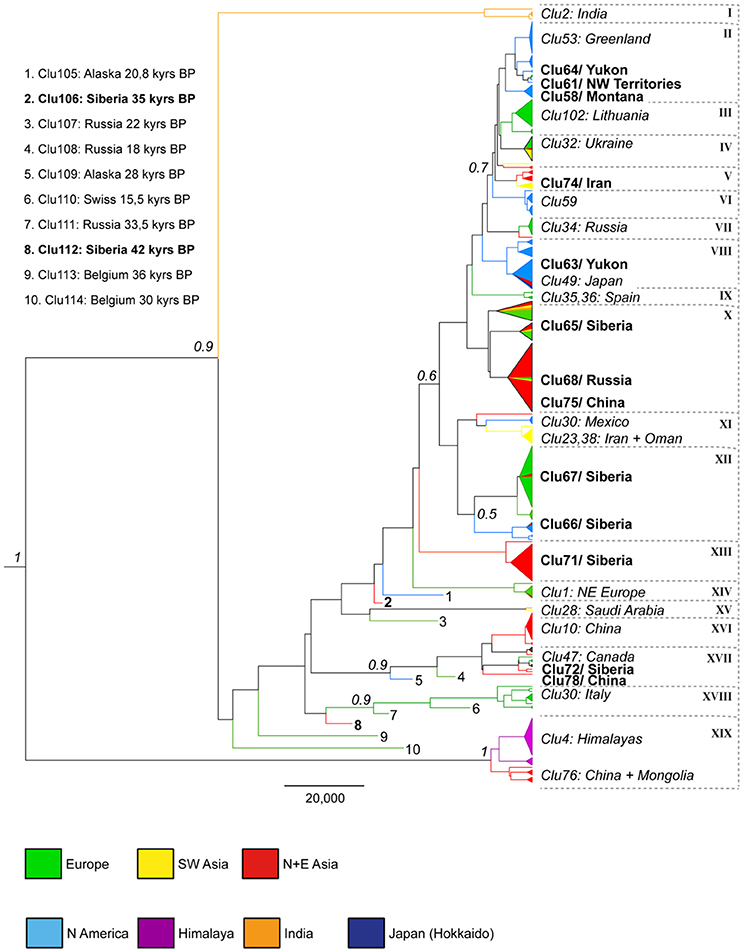
Phylogenetic tree of wolves under study

Phylogenetic tree

- common ancestor
  - Golden jackal
  - - Coyote
    - - Grey wolf
      - Dog

Phylogenetic relationship between four canids.

The mutations that are different in these 4 sequences have been numbered and bolded. These mutations can then be used to build a phylogenetic tree for the four canids. In this example, the dog and grey wolf differ by two substitutions (highlighted in red), and each of them differs from the coyote by four substitutions.

1 2 3 4 5 67

Golden Jackal A-G-C-T-G-T-C-GA-T-TC-CA

Coyote A-G-C-T-A-T-C-GA-A-TC-GA

Wolf T-G-C-T-A-T-G-GA-T-TC-CT

Dog T-G-G-T-A-T-G-GA-T-TC-CA

The mDNA sequences of the dog and wolf differ by only 0–12 substitutions within 261 base-pairs, whereas dogs always differed from coyotes and jackals by at least 20 substitutions. This finding implies that the dog derived from the wolf and that there has been repeated back-crossing, or that the dog may have descended from a now extinct species of canid whose closest living relative is the modern wolf.

==== Marker issue ====
Different DNA studies may give conflicting results because of the specimens selected, the technology used, and the assumptions made by the researchers. Any one from a panel of genetic markers can be chosen for use in a study. The techniques used to extract, locate and compare genetic sequences can be applied using advances in technology, which allows researchers to observe longer lengths of base pairs that provide more data to give better phylogenetic resolution. Phylogenetic trees compiled using different genetic markers have given conflicting results on the relationship between the wolf, dog and coyote. One study based on SNPs (a single mutation), and another based on nuclear gene sequences (taken from the cell nucleus), showed dogs clustering with coyotes and separate from wolves. Another study based on SNPS showed wolves clustering with coyotes and separate from dogs. Other studies based on a number of markers show the more widely accepted result of wolves clustering with dogs separate from coyotes. These results demonstrate that caution is needed when interpreting the results provided by genetic markers.

==== Timing issue ====
There are two key assumptions that are made for dating the divergence time for species: the generation time and the genetic mutation rate per generation. The time between generations for wolves is assumed to be three years based on the extant grey wolf, and two years for the dog based on the extant dog. One recent major study assumed a generation time of 2 years for the dog for as far back as 10,000 years ago, and then assumed a generation time of 3 years (the same as the wolf) before that to calculate a proposed divergence time between the two. In 2017, the wolf research scientist L. David Mech queried why evolutionary biologists were calculating the approximate time of the dog diverging from the wolf through using a wolf generation time of three years when published works using large data sets demonstrate a figure of 4.2–4.7 years. They were encouraged to recalculate their divergence dates accordingly.

DNA studies are conducted but with "the mutation rate as the dominant source of uncertainty." In 2005, Lindblad-Toh sequenced the first draft genome of the extant dog, and calculated a proposed mutation rate of 1 × 10^{−8} mutations per generation. In 2015, Skoglund was able to sequence the first draft genome of the 35,000 YBP Taimyr wolf and used its radio-carbon date to validate a proposed genetic mutation rate of 0.4 × 10^{−8} mutations per generation. The difference is a timing factor of 2.5, however another study stated that because only one Pleistocene wolf specimen has so far been sequenced, then the result should be treated with caution, with that study then providing both estimates to calculate the proposed divergence times between the wolf and dog. However, in 2016 the mutation rate of the 4,800 YBP Newgrange dog matched that of the Taimyr wolf.

=== Wolf-like canids ===
The wolf-like canids (the canid subfamily Caninae) are a group of large carnivores that are genetically closely related because their chromosomes number 78. The group includes genera Canis, Cuon and Lycaon. The members are the dog (C. familiaris), grey wolf (C. lupus), coyote (C. latrans), golden jackal (C. aureus), Ethiopian wolf (C. simensis), black-backed jackal (Lupulella mesomelas), side-striped jackal (Lupulella adusta), dhole (Cuon alpinus), and African wild dog (Lycaon pictus). Newly proposed members include the red wolf (Canis rufus), eastern wolf (Canis lycaon), and African golden wolf (C. anthus). As they possess 78 chromosomes, all members of the genus Canis (coyotes, wolves, jackals) are karyologically indistinguishable from each other, and from the dhole and the African hunting dog. The members of Canis can potentially interbreed and there is evidence that the Ethiopian wolf has hybridized with dogs. According to zoologist Reginald Pocock, a dhole interbred with a golden jackal. The African hunting dog is large, highly mobile, known to disperse over large distances and are rare throughout much of their geographical range, making opportunities for hybridization difficult. A study of the maternal mitochondrial DNA of the black-backed jackal could find no evidence of genotypes from the most likely mates – the side-striped jackal nor the golden jackal – indicating that male black-backed jackals had not bred with these. A search of the scientific literature could not find evidence of hybridization for the rare side-striped jackal.

A DNA sequence alignment for the wolf-like canids gave a phylogenetic tree with the grey wolf and dog being the most closely related, followed by a close affiliation with the coyote, golden jackal and Ethiopian wolf, and the dog can hybridize in the wild with these three species. Next closest to this group are the dhole and African wild dog that both have unique meat-slicing teeth, suggesting that this adaptation was later lost by the other members. The two African jackals are shown as the most basal members of this clade, which means that this tree is indicating an African origin for the clade. The tree illustrates the genotype–phenotype distinction, where a genotype is an organism's full hereditary information and a phenotype is an organism's actual observed properties, such as morphology, development, or behavior. By phenotype, the dhole (genus Cuon) and the African hunting dog (genus Lycaon) are not classified as members of the genus Canis, but by genotype they are closer to dogs, wolves and coyotes than are the two genus Canis jackals – the Side-striped jackal (C. adustus) and the Black-backed jackal (C. mesomelas).

In 2015, a study of mitochondrial genome sequences and nuclear genome sequences of African and Eurasian canids indicated that extant wolf-like canids had colonized Africa from Eurasia at least 5 times throughout the Pliocene and Pleistocene, which is consistent with fossil evidence suggesting that much of the African canid diversity resulted from the immigration of Eurasian ancestors, likely coincident with Plio-Pleistocene climatic oscillations between arid and humid conditions.

The phylogenetic tree for the wolf-like canids may give conflicting positions for the black-backed jackal and the side-striped jackal relative to the genus Canis members depending on whether the genetic markers were based on mitochondrial DNA or nuclear DNA. The explanation proposed for this mito-nuclear discord is that mitochondrial DNA introgression occurred from an ancient ancestor of genus Canis into the lineage that led to the black-backed jackal around 6.2–5.2 million years ago.

Phylogenetic tree of the extant wolf-like canids, (Note: Phylogenetic relationships and time of genetic divergence for the extant wolf-like canids based on DNA of the entire cell nucleus. Exception 1: Side-striped jackal and Black-backed jackal added based on segments of DNA taken from the cell nucleus with proposed divergence times in millions of years. Exception 2: The position of the Himalayan wolf is based on segments of mitochondrial DNA and segments from the cell nucleus. Exception 3: The position of the Indian plains wolf is based on mDNA. and its timing 120,000 years ago. Exception 4: Late Pleistocene wolf included for time-line purposes only - the most recent common ancestor for all other Canis lupus specimens – modern and extinct but excluding the Indian plains wolf and the Himalayan wolf – was 80,000 years before present. Exception 5: Grey wolf and dog timing 25,000 years ago.) with the pink shading representing the species Canis lupus.

- - - - - - - - - Present

- - - - Side-striped jackal
      - Black-backed jackal
  - - - African wild dog
    - - - Dhole
      - - - Ethiopian wolf
        - - - Golden jackal
          - - - African golden wolf
            - - - Coyote
              - - - Himalayan wolf
                - - - Indian
                      plains wolf
                  - - - †Late Pleistocene
                        wolf
                    - - Modern grey wolf
                      - Dog

==== Admixture with an extinct unknown canid ====
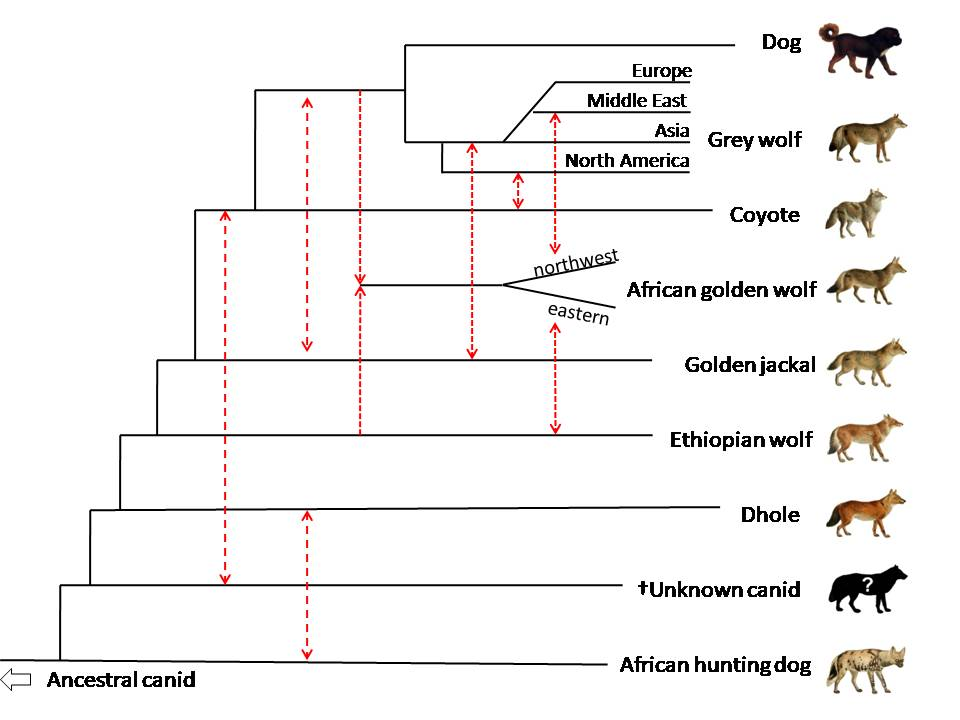
Canis hybridisation in the distant past

In 2018, whole genome sequencing was used to compare members of genus Canis, along with the dhole (Cuon alpinus) and the African hunting dog (Lycaon pictus). There is evidence of gene flow between African golden wolves, golden jackals, and grey wolves. The study suggests that the African golden wolf is a descendant of a genetically admixed canid of 72% grey wolf and 28% Ethiopian wolf ancestry, and that the Ethiopian wolf once had a wider range in Africa. One African golden wolf from the Egyptian Sinai Peninsula showed high admixture with the Middle Eastern grey wolves and dogs, highlighting the role of the land bridge between the African and Eurasian continents in canid evolution. There is evidence of gene flow between golden jackals and Middle Eastern wolves, less so with European and Asian wolves, and least with North American wolves. The study proposes that the golden jackal ancestry found in North American wolves may have occurred before the divergence of the Eurasian and North American grey wolves. The study indicates that the common ancestor of the coyote and grey wolf has genetically admixed with a ghost population of an extinct unidentified canid. The canid is genetically close to the dhole and has evolved after the divergence of the African hunting dog from the other canid species. The basal position of the coyote compared to the wolf is proposed to be due to the coyote retaining more of the mitochondrial genome of this unknown canid.

A genomic study on the wolves of China included museum specimens of wolves from southern China that were collected between 1963 and 1988. The wolves in the study formed 3 clades: north Asian wolves that included those from northern China and eastern Russia, Himalayan wolves from the Tibetan Plateau, and a unique population from southern China. One specimen located as far southeast as Jiangxi province shows evidence of being admixed between Tibetan-related wolves and other wolves in China. One specimen from Zhejiang province in eastern China shared gene flow with the wolves from southern China, however its genome was 12-14 percent admixed with a canid that may be the dhole or an unknown canid that predates the genetic divergence of the dhole. The wolf population from southern China is believed to be still existing in that region.

=== Out of Beringia ===
Grey wolves suffered a species-wide population bottleneck (reduction) approximately 25,000 YBP during the Last Glacial Maximum. This was followed by a single population of modern wolves expanding out of a Beringia refuge to repopulate the wolf's former range, replacing the remaining Late Pleistocene wolf populations across Eurasia and North America as they did so. This source population probably did not give rise to dogs, but admixed with dogs which allowed them to gain coat colour genes that are also related to immunity, and provided dogs with genes which allowed them to adapt to high-altitude environments (e.g. Tibet). This suggests that the genetic divergence of European and East Asian dogs could be based on admixture with different sub-populations of wolves.

There is little genetic information available on the ancient wolves that existed prior to the bottleneck. However, studies show that one or more of these ancient populations is more directly ancestral to dogs than are modern wolves, and conceivably these were more prone to domestication by the first humans to invade Eurasia.

As of 2020, the oldest known intact wolf remains belongs to a mummified pup dated 56,000 YBP that was recovered from the permafrost along a small tributary of Last Chance Creek near Dawson City, Yukon, Canada. A DNA analysis showed that it belonged to the Beringian wolf clade, that the most recent common ancestor of this clade dates to 86,700–67,500 YBP, and that this clade was basal to all other wolves except for the Himalayan wolf.

=== Into America and Japan ===
Shrinking of the Bering land bridge

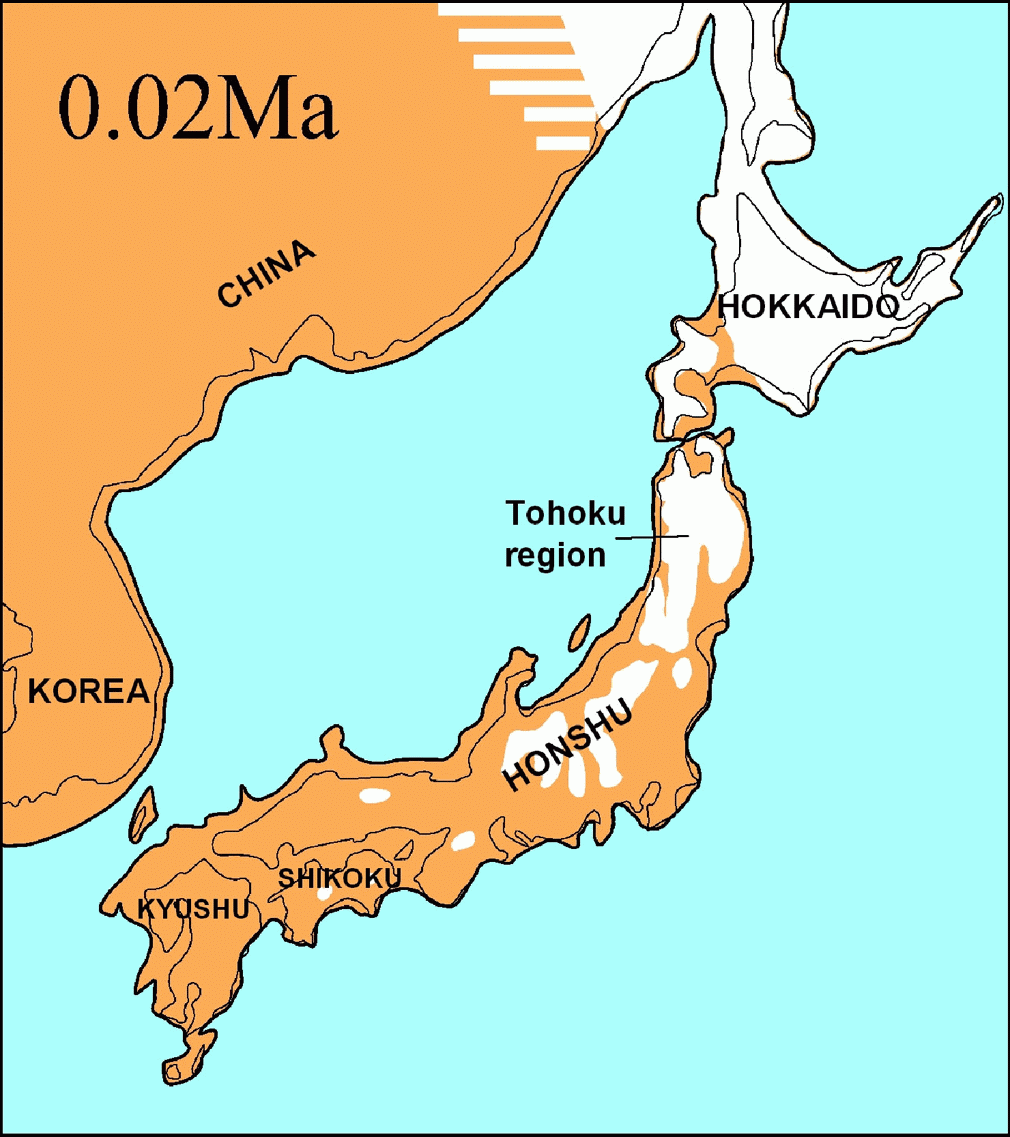
Japanese archipelago 20,000 years ago with Hokkaido island bridged to the mainland, thin black line indicates present-day shoreline

In 2016, a study built on the work of another major study and analyzed the sequences of 12 genes that are located on the heavy strand of the mitochondrial genome of extinct and modern C. lupus. The study excluded the sequences of the divergent Himalayan wolf and the Indian grey wolf. The ancient specimens were radiocarbon dated and stratagraphically dated, and together with the sequences generated a time-based phylogenetic tree. From the tree, the study was able to infer the most recent common ancestor for all other C. lupus specimens – modern and extinct – was 80,000 YBP and this date concurred with the earlier study. The study could find no evidence of a population bottleneck for wolves until a few thousand years ago.

The phylogenetic tree showed the polyphyly of American wolves, the Mexican wolf was divergent from other North American wolves, and these other North American wolves formed two closely related clades. A scenario consistent with the phylogenetic, ice sheet and sea-level data was that during the Ice Age when sea levels were at their lowest, there was a single wave of wolf colonization into North America starting with the opening of the Bering land bridge 70,000 YBP and closing during the Late Glacial Maximum of the Yukon corridor that ran through the division between the Laurentide Ice Sheet and the Cordilleran Ice Sheet 23,000 YBP. Mexican wolves were part of the single wave and either diverged from the other wolves before entering North America or once in North America due to the change in its environment.

As wolves had been in the fossil record of North America but modern wolves could trace their ancestry back only 80,000 years, the wolf haplotypes that were already in North America were replaced by these invaders, either through competitive displacement or through admixture. The replacement in North America of a basal population of wolves by a more recent one supported the findings of earlier studies. There possibly existed a panmictic wolf population with gene flow spanning Eurasia and North America until the closing of the ice sheets. Once the sheets closed, the southern wolves were isolated and north of the sheets only the Beringian wolf existed. The land bridge became inundated by the sea 10,000 YBP, the sheets receded 12,000–6,000 YBP, the Beringian wolf went extinct and the southern wolves expanded to recolonize the rest of North America. All North American wolves are descended from those that were once isolated south of the ice sheets. However, much of their diversity was later lost during the twentieth century.

Studies using mitochondrial DNA have indicated that the wolves of coastal south-east Alaska are genetically distinct from inland grey wolves, reflecting a pattern also observed in other taxa. They show a phylogenetic relationship with extirpated wolves from the south (Oklahoma), indicating that these wolves are the last remains of a once widespread group that has been largely extirpated during the last century, and that the wolves of northern North America had originally expanded from southern refuges below the Wisconsin glaciation after the ice had melted at the end of the Last Glacial Maximum. A whole-genome DNA study indicated that all North American wolves were monophyletic and therefore are the descendants of a common ancestor.

During the same period, the Soya Strait between Hokkaido and Sakhalin Island was dry for 75,000 years and it was proposed that the extinct Ezo wolf (C. l. hattai) arrived on Hokkaido from Sakhalin. However, the sequences indicated that it arrived in Hokkaido less than 10,000 YBP. The Ezo wolf was closely related to one of the North American clades, but different from the more southerly Japanese wolf (C. l. hodophilax) that was basal to modern wolves. The Japanese wolf inhabited Kyushu, Shikoku, and Honshu islands but not Hokkaido Island. This indicates that its ancestor may have migrated from the Asian continent through the Korean Peninsula into Japan. The past sea levels of the Korean Strait together with the timing of the Japanese wolf sequences indicated that it arrived to the southern islands less than 20,000 YBP. In 2020, a genomic study found that the Japanese wolf was the last of the Siberian Pleistocene wolves, which were thought to have gone extinct at the end of the Late Pleistocene (11,700 years ago). Some of these had survived into the 20th Century and had admixed with Japanese dogs.

The dog was a very successful invader of North America and had established a widespread ecological niche by the Early–Middle Holocene. There was no overlap in niche between the dog and the wolf in comparison to the dog and other North American canids. By the Late Holocene, the dog's niche area was less in size than researchers had expected to find, indicating that it was limited by biotic factors. These regions include the northeast and northwest of the United States that correlate with the greatest densities of early human occupation, indicating that the dog had "defected" from the wolf niche to the human niche and explains why the dog's niche area was not as large as expected. The separation between dog and wolf may reflect the rapid rate in which domestication occurred, including the possibility of a second domestication event occurring in North America. Packs of wolves and hunter-gatherers hunt similar prey in a similar way within a similar group social structure that may have facilitated wolf domestication.

The wolf was exterminated in the southern part of their historic geographical range in North America by the middle of the 20th century. An mDNA study of 34 wolf remains from North America dated between 1856 and 1915 found their genetic diversity to be twice that of modern wolves in these regions, and two thirds of the haplotypes identified were unique. These results indicate that a historic population of several hundred thousand wolves once existed in Mexico and the western US.

=== Divergence with the coyote ===
In 1993, a study proposed that the wolves of North America display skull traits more similar towards the coyote than those wolves from Eurasia. In 2016, a whole-genome DNA study proposed, based on the assumptions made, that all of the North American wolves and coyotes diverged from a common ancestor less than 6,000–117,000 years ago. The study also indicated that all North American wolves have a significant amount of coyote ancestry and all coyotes some degree of wolf ancestry, and that the red wolf and eastern wolf are highly admixed with different proportions of grey wolf and coyote ancestry. However, the test that was used cannot differentiate between ancient and recent hybridization. One test indicated a wolf/coyote divergence time of 51,000 years before present that matched other studies indicating that the extant wolf came into being around this time. Another test indicated that the red wolf diverged from the coyote between 55,000 and 117,000 years before present and the Great Lakes region wolf 32,000 years before present. But a 2000 study on the haplotypes of North American canids showed that the divergences between coyotes, grey wolves, red wolves, and Algonquin (eastern) wolves happened much earlier. This study showed that there was a 3.2% divergence between the eastern Canadian wolf and coyote gene sequences, and a 2.3% sequence divergence between the red wolf and coyote haplotypes. However, the divergence was a much greater 8.0% between gray wolf (C. lupus) mtDNA and eastern/red wolf haplotypes, and 10.0% between gray wolf and coyote haplotypes. The sequence difference observed between eastern Canadian wolf sequences and coyote sequences is consistent with a separation of 150 000 – 300 000 years, using a divergence rate of 1–2% per 100 000 years. Additionally, conflicting with the recent divergent hypothesis, the fossil record that indicates a coyote-like specimen dated to 1 million years before present.

The modern grey wolf expanded out of Beringia 25,000 years ago. The modern coyote appeared around 10,000 years ago, and most likely descended from the Pleistocene coyote. The most genetically basal coyote mDNA clade pre-dates the Last Glacial Maximum and is a haplotype that can only be found in the Eastern wolf. This implies that the large, wolf-like Pleistocene coyote was the ancestor of the Eastern wolf and Red wolf, which diverged from each other later in time.

=== Domestic dog ===
The domestic dog (Canis lupus familiaris) is the most widely abundant large carnivore. Over the past million years, numerous wolf-like forms existed but their turnover has been high, and modern wolves are not the lineal ancestors of dogs. Although research had suggested that dogs and wolves were genetically very close relatives, later phylogenetic analysis strongly supported the hypothesis that dogs and wolves are reciprocally monophylic taxa that form two sister clades. This suggests that none of the modern wolf populations are related to the wolves that were first domesticated and the wolf ancestor of dogs is therefore presumed extinct. Recent mitochondrial DNA analyses of ancient and modern grey wolf specimens supports a pattern of population reduction and turnover. An alternate proposal is that during the ecological upheavals of the Late Pleistocene all of the remaining members of a dwindling lineage joined humans.

In 2016, a study investigated for the first time the population subdivisions, demography, and the relationships of grey wolves based on their whole-genome sequences. The study indicated that the dog was a divergent subspecies of the grey wolf and was derived from a now-extinct ghost population of Late Pleistocene wolves, and the dog and the dingo are not separate species. The genome-wide phylogenetic tree indicated a genetic divergence between New World and Old World wolves, which was then followed by a divergence between the dog and Old World wolves 27,000YBP – 29,000 YBP. The dog forms a sister taxon with Eurasian grey wolves but not North American wolves. The dog had considerable pre-ancestry after its divergence from the Old World wolves before it separated into distinct lineages that are nearly as distinct from one another as they are from wolves. The study suggested that previous datings based on the divergence between wolves and coyotes of one million years ago using fossils of what appeared to be coyote-like specimens may not reflect the ancestry of the modern forms.

Grey wolf divergence and timing in years before present

- wolf/dog ancestor
  - New World clade 31,000
    - 13,000
      Mexico
    - North America/Hokkaido
  - Old World clade
    - Old World wolves
      - 27,500
        - Asian highland
        - Asian lowland
      - - Middle East
        - Europe
    - Ancestral dog 29,000
      - 25,700
        Dog
      - Dingo
      - Basenji

Whole-genome phylogenetic tree of modern grey wolf populations.

The study indicated that the Mexican wolf was also a divergent form of grey wolf, suggesting that may have been part of an early invasion into North America. The Tibetan wolf was found to be the most highly divergent of the Old World wolves, had suffered a historical population bottleneck and had only recently recolonized the Tibetan Plateau. Glaciation may have caused its habitat loss, genetic isolation then local adaption.

The study indicated that there has been extensive genetic admixture between domestic dogs and wolves, with up to 25% of the genome of Old World wolves showing signs of dog ancestry, possibly as the result of gene flow from dogs into wolves that were ancestral to all modern wolves. There was evidence of significant gene flow between the European wolves plus the Israeli wolf with the basenji and boxer, which suggests admixture between the lineages ancestral to these breeds and wolf populations. For the lowland Asian wolves: the Central Russian and East Russian wolves and all of the lowland Chinese wolves had significant gene flow with the Chinese indigenous dogs, the Tibetan Mastiff and the dingo. For the highland Asian wolves: The Tibetan wolves did not show significant admixture with dogs; however, the Qinghai wolves had gene flow with the dingo and one of them had gene flow with the Chinese dogs. The New World wolves did not show any gene flow with the boxer, dingo or Chinese indigenous dogs but there was indication of gene flow between the Mexican wolf and the African basenji. All species within the genus Canis, the wolf-like canids, are phylogenetically closely related with 78 chromosomes and can potentially interbreed. There was indication of gene flow into the golden jackal from the population ancestral to all wolves and dogs (11.3%–13.6%) and much lower rates (up to 2.8%) from extant wolf populations.

The data indicated that all wolves shared similar population trajectories, followed by population decline that coincided with the expansion of modern humans worldwide and their technology for capturing large game. Late Pleistocene carnivores would have been social living in large prides, clans and packs in order to hunt the larger game available at that time, and these larger groups would have been more conspicuous targets for human persecutors. Large dogs accompanying the humans may have accelerated the rate of decline of carnivores that competed for game, therefore humans expanded across Eurasia, encountered wolves, domesticated some and possibly caused the decline of others.

The study concluded that admixture had confounded the ability to make inferences about the place of dog domestication. Past studies based on SNPs, genome-wide similarities with Chinese wolves, and lower linkage disequilibrium might reflect regional admixture between dogs with wolves and gene flow between dog populations, with divergent dog breeds possibly maintaining more wolf ancestry in their genome. The study proposed that analysis of ancient DNA might be a better approach.

In the same year, a study found that there were only 11 fixed genes that showed variation between wolves and dogs. These genes are thought to affect tameness and emotional processing ability. Another study provided a listing of all of the grey wolf and dog mDNA haplotypes combined in the one phylogenetic tree.

In 2018, a study compared the sequences of 61,000 Single-nucleotide polymorphisms (mutations) taken from across the genome of grey wolves. The study indicated that there exists individual wolves of dog/wolf ancestry in most of the wolf populations of Eurasia but less so in North America. The hybridization has been occurring across different time scales and was not a recent event. Low-level hybridization did not reduce the wolf distinctiveness.

==== Dingo ====
The dingo (Canis familiaris dingo, Canis lupus dingo, Canis dingo) refers to the dog found in Australia. The dingo's taxonomy is the subject of much debate. It is considered by some researchers as a divergent subspecies of the grey wolf and not a separate species, who believe it genetically to be a basal member of the domestic dog clade. Other researchers have identified numerous divergences in both behaviour and genetics from C. familiaris, and thus consider it to be its own species, Canis dingo. Genetic evidence indicates a link with East Asian domestic dogs through the South-East Asian archipelago, with a common ancestry between the Australian dingo and the New Guinea Singing Dog.

=== Canis variabilis ===
In 2015, a study looked at the mitochondrial control region sequences of 13 ancient canid remains and one modern wolf from five sites across Arctic north-east Siberia. The fourteen canids revealed nine mitochondrial haplotypes, three of which were on record and the others not reported before. The phylogentic tree generated from the sequences showed that four of the Siberian canids dated 28,000 YBP and one Canis c.f. variabilis dated 360,000 YBP were highly divergent. The haplotype designated as S805 (28,000 YBP) from the Yana River was one mutation away from another haplotype S902 (8,000 YBP) that represents Clade A of the modern wolf and domestic dog lineages. Closely related to this haplotype was one that was found in the recently extinct Japanese wolf. Several ancient haplotypes were oriented around S805, including Canis c.f. variabilis (360,000 YBP), Belgium (36,000 YBP – the "Goyet dog"), Belgium (30,000 YBP), and Konsteki, Russia (22,000 YBP). Given the position of the S805 haplotype on the phylogenetic tree, it may potentially represent a direct link from the progenitor (including Canis c.f. variabilis) to the domestic dog and modern wolf lineages. The grey wolf is thought to be ancestral to the domestic dog, however its relationship to C. variabilis, and the genetic contribution of C. variabilis to the dog, is the subject of debate.

The Zhokhov Island (8,700 YBP) and Aachim (1,700 YBP) canid haplotypes fell within the domestic dog clade, cluster with S805, and also share their haplotypes with – or are one mutation away from – the Tibetan wolf (C. l. filchneri) and the recently extinct Japanese wolf (C. l. hodophilax). This may indicate that these canids retained the genetic signature of admixture with regional wolf populations. Another haplotype designated as S504 (47,000 YBP) from Duvanny Yar appeared on the phylogenetic tree as not being connected to wolves (both ancient and modern) yet ancestral to dogs, and may represent a genetic source for regional dogs.

The authors concluded that the structure of the modern dog gene pool was contributed to from ancient Siberian wolves and possibly from Canis c.f. variabilis.

== Rise to dominant predator ==
In 2015, a study looked at the paleoecology of large carnivores across the Mammoth steppe during the Late Pleistocene by using stable isotope analysis of their fossil collagen to reconstruct their diets. Based on testing in Belgium, around 40,000 YBP the Cave hyenas preyed on mammoth, woolly rhinoceros, horses and reindeer, with cave lions taking reindeer and young cave bears. Wolves appear to have been out-competed by cave hyenas and had their diet restricted to chamois, giant deer and red deer. However, after the Last Glacial Maximum around 14,000 YBP, wolves had access to all prey species, the cave lion was restricted to reindeer, and the cave hyena had gone extinct. The data suggests that the extinction of the cave hyena allowed the wolf to become the dominant predator rather than the cave lion, just before the cave lion's extinction. Another study indicated that the wolf thrived compared to the cave hyena when there was greater snow cover.

== Wolf population differences ==
The grey wolf Canis lupus is a highly adaptable species that is able to exist in a range of environments and which possesses a wide distribution across the Holarctic. Studies of modern grey wolves have identified distinct sub-populations that live in close proximity to each other. This variation in sub-populations is closely linked to differences in habitat – precipitation, temperature, vegetation, and prey specialization – which affect cranio-dental plasticity. The archaeological and paleontological records show their continuous presence for at least the last 300,000 years. This continuous wolf presence contrasts with genomic studies, which suggest that all modern wolves and dogs descend from a common ancestral wolf population that existed as recently as 20,000 years ago. These studies indicate that a population bottleneck was followed by a rapid radiation from an ancestral population at a time during, or just after, the Last Glacial Maximum. This implies that the original wolf populations were out-competed by a new type of wolf which replaced them. However, the geographic origin of this radiation is not known.

Apart from domestication, humans have harmed the wolf by restricting its habitat through persecution. This has caused a dramatic decrease in its population size over the last two centuries. The shrinking of its habitats that overlap with those of close-relatives such as dogs and coyotes have led to numerous occurrences of hybridization. These events, in addition to recent turnovers (extinctions and repopulations by other geneotypes), has made the unravelling of the phylogeographic history of the wolf difficult.

=== Ecotypes ===
An ecotype is a variant in which the phenotypic differences are too few or too subtle to warrant being classified as a subspecies. These can occur in the same geographic region where distinct habitats such as meadow, forest, swamp, and sand dunes provide ecological niches. Where similar ecological conditions occur in widely separated places it is possible for a similar ecotype to occur. This is different from a subspecies, which may exist across a number of different habitats. In animals, ecotypes can be regarded as micro-subspecies that owe their differing characteristics to the effects of a very local environment. Ecotypes have no taxonomic rank.

Grey wolves have a wide, natural distribution across the Holarctic that includes many different habitats, which can vary from the high arctic to dense forests, open steppe and deserts. The genetic differences between different populations of grey wolves is tightly linked to the type of habitat in which they live. Differences in genetic markers among the Scandinavian wolf population has arisen in only just over a decade due to their small population size, which indicates that these differences are not dependent on a long time spent in isolation and that larger population patterns can evolve in just a few thousand years. These differences can also include fur color and density, and body size. The differences can also include behavior, as coastal wolves eat fish and tundra wolves migrate. These differences have been observed between two wolf populations that are living in close proximity. It has been shown that mountain wolves do not interbreed with nearby coastal wolves, and the Alps of France and Switzerland have been repopulated with wolves from the mountains of nearby Italy and from the far away mountains of Croatia rather than from the nearer lowlands, which indicates that distance is not the driving force in differences between the two ecomorphs.

In 2013, a genetic study found that the wolf population in Europe was divided along a north–south axis and formed five major clusters. Three clusters were identified occupying southern and central Europe in Italy, the Carpathians, and the Dinaric-Balkans. Another two clusters were identified occupying north-central Europe and the Ukrainian steppe. The Italian wolf consisted of an isolated population with low genetic diversity. Wolves from Croatia, Bulgaria, and Greece formed the Dinaric-Balkans cluster. Wolves from Finland, Latvia, Belarus, Poland and Russia formed the north-central Europe cluster with wolves from the Carpathians cluster a mixture of wolves from the north-central cluster and the Dinaric-Balkans cluster. The wolves from the Carpathians were more similar to the wolves from the Ukrainian Steppe than they were to wolves from north-central Europe. These clusters may have been the result of expansion from glacial refugia, an adaptation to local environments, and landscape fragmentation and the killing of wolves in some areas by humans.

In 2016, two studies compared the sequences of 42,000 single nucleotide polymorphisms in North American grey wolves and found that they formed six ecotypes. These six wolf ecotypes were named West Forest, Boreal Forest, Arctic, High Arctic, Baffin, and British Columbia. The studies found that precipitation and mean diurnal temperature range were the most influential variables on sequence variation. These findings were in accord with previous findings that precipitation influenced morphology, and that vegetation and habitat type influenced wolf differences. One of these studies found that the variation in 11 key genes affected wolf vision, sense of smell, hearing, coat color, metabolism, and immunity. The study identified 1,040 genes that are potentially under selection due to habitat variation, and therefore that there was evidence of local adaption of the wolf ecotypes at a molecular level. Most notable was the positive selection of genes that influence vision, coat color, metabolism and immunity in the Arctic and High Arctic ecotypes, and that the British Columbia ecotype also has a unique set of adaptions. The local adaptation of a wolf ecotype most likely reflects a wolf's preference to remain in the type of habitat that it was born into.

Ecological factors including habitat type, climate, prey specialization and predatory competition will greatly influence grey wolf genetic population structure and cranio-dental plasticity. During the Last Glacial Maximum, there was greater wolf genetic diversity than there is today, and within the Pleistocene grey wolf population the variations between local environments would have encouraged a range of wolf ecotypes that were genetically, morphologically and ecologically distinct from one another.

=== Pleistocene wolves ===
During the Last Glacial Maximum 20,000 YBP, the Pleistocene steppe stretched across northern and central Eurasia and through Beringia into North America. The Pleistocene wolves of Beringia, and perhaps those across the steppe, were adapted to this habitat. Their tooth and skull morphology indicates that they specialized in preying on now-extinct Pleistocene megafauna, and their tooth wear indicates that their behavior was different from modern wolves. This highlights the success of C. lupus as a species in adapting to different environmental conditions. This grey wolf ecomorph became extinct at the end of the glaciation, along with the horse and other species on which it depended, and was replaced by wolves from southern North America. This indicates that specialized wolf ecomorphs can become extinct when their environment changes even though the habitat may still support other wolves. Wolves went through a population bottleneck 20,000 YBP that coincides with the Last Glacial Maximum, which indicates that many wolf populations may have gone extinct at the same time as the Beringian wolves.

There are a small number of Canis remains that have been found at Goyet Cave, Belgium (36,500 YBP) Razboinichya Cave, Russia (33,500 YBP) Kostenki 8, Russia (33,500–26,500 YBP) Predmosti, Czech Republic (31,000 YBP) and Eliseevichi 1, Russia (17,000 YBP). Based on cranial morphometric study of the characteristics thought to be associated with the domestication process, these have been proposed as early Paleolithic dogs. These characteristics of shortened rostrum, tooth crowding, and absence or rotation of premolars have been documented in both ancient and modern wolves. Rather than representing early dogs, these specimens may represent "a morphologically distinct local, now extinct, population of wolves".

== Works ==
- Wang, Xiaoming; Tedford, Richard H. (2008). Dogs: Their Fossil Relatives and Evolutionary History. Columbia University Press, New York. pp. 1–232. ISBN 978-0-231-13529-0. OCLC 502410693.
