= Villafranchian =

Period of geologic time (3.5–1.0 Ma)

Neogene ELMMZ

Villafranchian age (/ˌvɪləˈfræŋkiən/ VIL-ə-FRANK-ee-ən) is a period of geologic time (3.5–1.0 Ma) spanning the Late Pliocene and Early Pleistocene used more specifically with European Land Mammal Ages. Named by Italian geologist Lorenzo Pareto for a sequence of terrestrial sediments studied near Villafranca d'Asti, a town near Turin, it succeeds the Ruscinian age, and is followed by the Galerian.

The Villafranchian is sub-divided into six faunal units based on the localities of Triversa, Montopoli, Saint-Vallier, Olivola, Tasso and Farnetta.

A major division of European geological deposits and time, the Villafranchian is significant because it marked the first arrival of archaic humans into Europe towards the end of the period. The Villafranchian is partially contemporaneous with the Blancan Stage of North America.

The beginning of the Villafranchian is typically defined by the first appearance of the bovid genus Leptobos in Italy, dated to around 3.5-3.6 million years ago (mya). The beginning of the Middle Villafranchian is defined by the "elephant–Equus event" denoting the first appearance of the mammoth Mammuthus meridionalis and the equine Equus stenonis, thought to be around 2.5-2.6 mya. The beginning of the Late Villafranchian was formerly typically defined by the "Wolf event", the first appearance of Canis etruscus , but this was later considered to be diachronous. It was later proposed that the boundary be placed at the first appearance of the giant hyena Pachycrocuta brevirostris approximately 1.8 mya. The transition between the Villafranchian and the following Galerian has been placed as its own biochron, the Epivillafranchian, coincident with the end of the Early Pleistocene around 1.2-0.9/0.8 million years ago. This period was marked by numerous extinctions, including those of Pachycrocuta, the sabertoothed cat Megantereon, and Mammuthus meridionalis.
