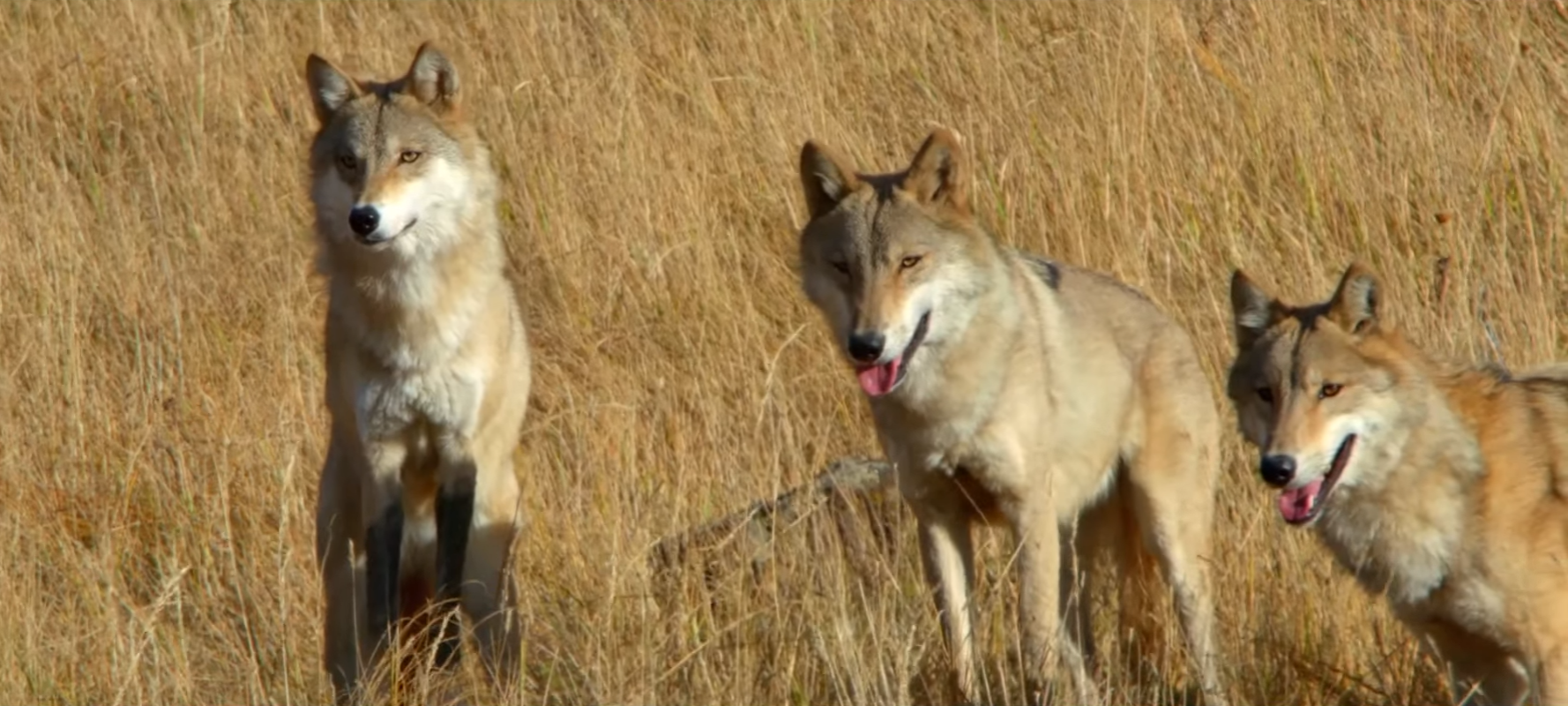

Conservation status
- Vulnerable (IUCN 3.1)

Scientific classification
- Kingdom: Animalia
- Phylum: Chordata
- Class: Mammalia
- Order: Carnivora
- Family: Canidae
- Genus: Canis
- Species: C. lupus
- Subspecies: C. l. chanco

Trinomial name
- Canis lupus chanco Gray, 1863
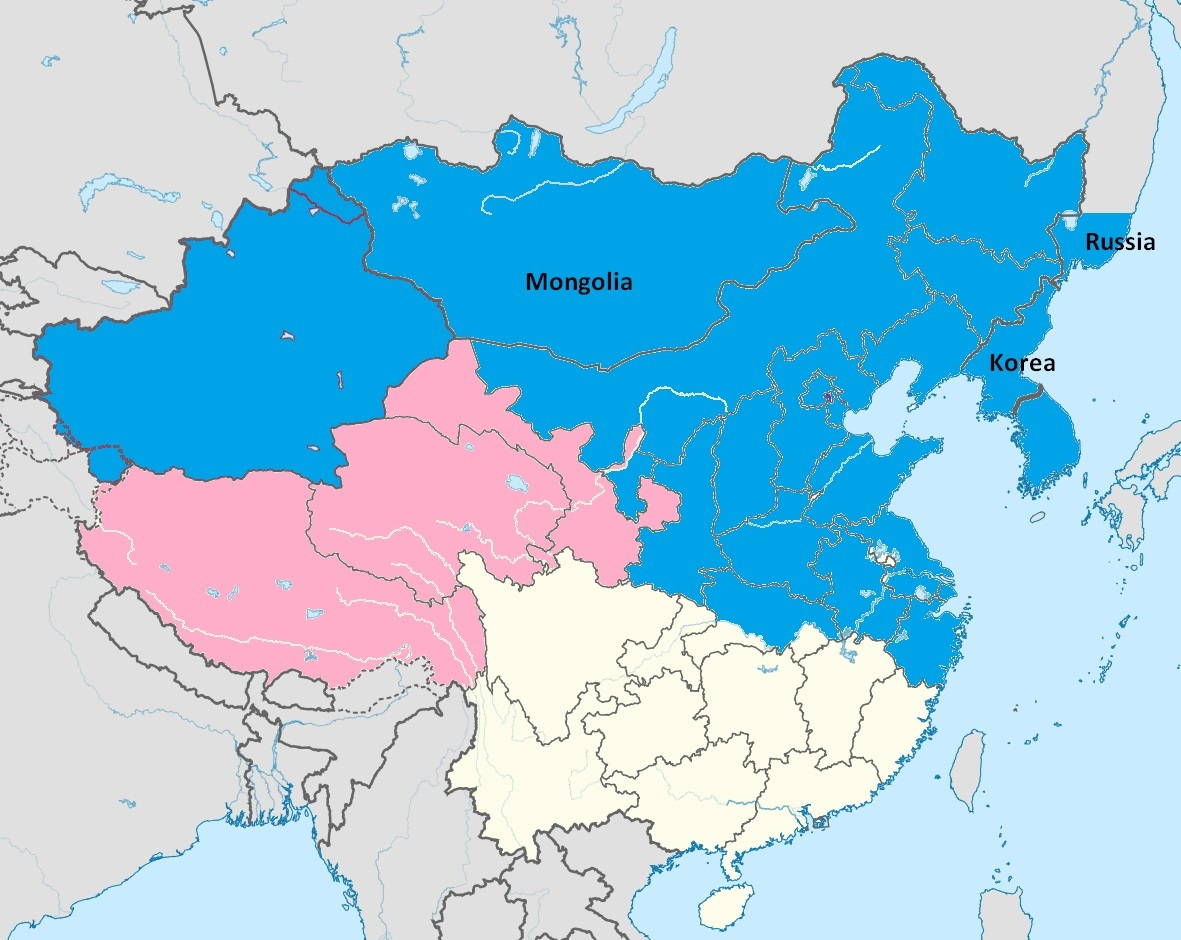
- Map showing the range of the Mongolian wolf (blue) and the Himalayan wolf (pink) in China, Mongolia, Korea, and Russia

Synonyms
- coreanus (Abe, 1923); dorogostaiskii (Skalon, 1936); karanorensis (Matschie, 1907); niger (Sclater, 1874); tschillensis (Matschie, 1907))

= Mongolian wolf =

Subspecies of mammal

The Mongolian wolf (Canis lupus chanco) is a subspecies of gray wolf which is native to Mongolia, northern and central China, Korea, and the Ussuri region of Russia.

== Taxonomy ==
Canis chanco was the scientific name proposed by John Edward Gray in 1863 who described a skin of a wolf that was shot in Chinese Tartary. This specimen was classified as a wolf subspecies Canis lupus chanco by St. George Jackson Mivart in 1880. In 1923, Japanese zoologist Yoshio Abe proposed separating the wolves of the Korean Peninsula from C. chanco as a separate species, C. coreanus, because of their comparatively narrower muzzle. This distinction was contested by Reginald Pocock, who dismissed it as a local variant of C. chanco. In the third edition of Mammal Species of the World published in 2005, the mammalogist W. Christopher Wozencraft listed under the wolf Canis lupus the taxonomic synonyms for the subspecies Canis lupus chanco. Wozencraft classified C. coreanus (Abe, 1923) as one of its synonyms.

There remains taxonomic confusion over the Mongolian wolf. In 1941, Pocock had referred to the Tibetan wolf as C. l. laniger and classified it as a synonym under C. l. chanco. However, Wozencraft included C. l. laniger as a synonym for C. l. filchneri Matschie (1907). There are some researchers who still refer to Pocock's classification of the Tibetan wolf as C. l. chanco, which has caused taxonomic confusion. The NCBI/Genbank lists C. l. chanco as the Mongolian wolf but C. l. laniger as the Tibetan wolf, and there are academic works that refer to C. l. chanco as the Mongolian wolf.

To add further confusion, in 2019, a workshop hosted by the IUCN/SSC Canid Specialist Group noted that the Himalayan wolf's distribution included the Himalayan range and the Tibetan Plateau. The group recommends that this wolf lineage be known as the "Himalayan wolf" and classified as Canis lupus chanco until a genetic analysis of the holotypes is available. The Himalayan wolf currently lacks a proper morphological analysis.

== Morphological description ==
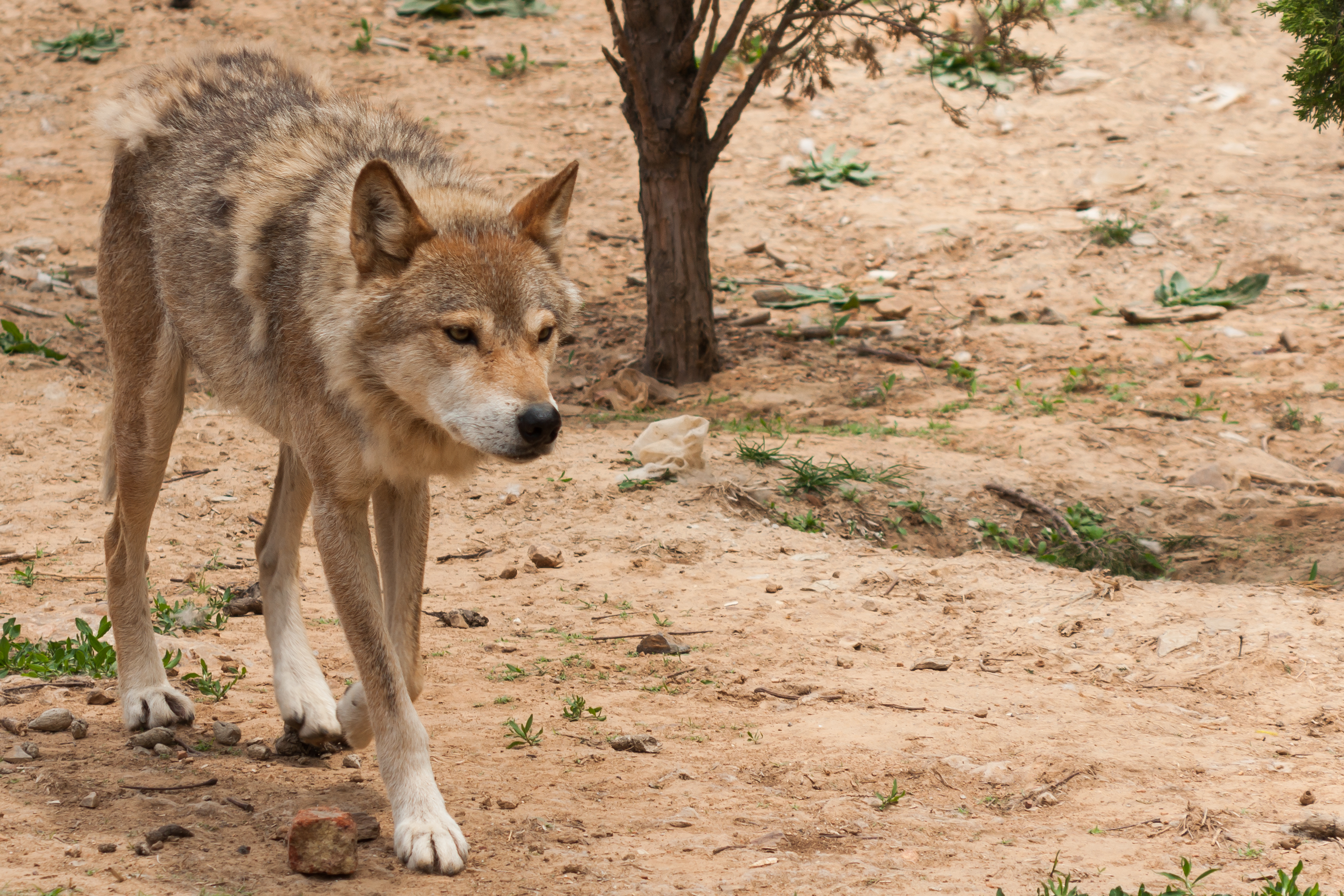
Mongolian wolf in Dalian Forest Zoo, Liaoning, China

Gray described the type specimen from Chinese Tartary as follows:

The fur fulvous, on the back longer, rigid, with intermixed black and gray hairs; the throat, chest, belly, and inside of the legs pure white; head pale gray-brown; forehead grizzled with short black and gray hairs. Hab. Chinese Tartary. Called Chanco. The skull is very similar to, and has the same teeth as, the European wolf (C. lupus). The animal is very like the Common Wolf, but rather shorter on the legs; and the ears, the sides of the body, and outside of the limbs are covered with short, pale fulvous hairs. The length of its head and body are 42 in (1,100 mm); tail 15 in (380 mm).

The prominent Russian zoologist, Vladimir Georgievich Heptner, described Mongolian wolves from the Ussuri region of Russia as follows:

Dimensions are not large – like C. l. desertorum, or somewhat larger, but markedly smaller than the Siberian forest wolves. Coloration is dirty gray, frosted with a weak admixture of ocherous color and without pale-yellow or chestnut tones. The fur is coarse and stiff. Total body length of males 93 cm (37 in) – 158 cm (62 in); tail length 30 cm (12 in) – 40 cm (16 in); hind foot length 16 cm (6.3 in) – 24 cm (9.4 in); ear height 10 cm (3.9 in) – 14.5 cm (5.7 in); shoulder height 58 cm (23 in) – 75 cm (30 in); and weight 26 kg (57 lb) – 37 kg (82 lb). Total body length of females 90 cm (35 in) – 109 cm (43 in); tail length 30 cm (12 in) – 40 cm (16 in); hind foot length 16 cm (6.3 in) – 23 cm (9.1 in); ear height 9.5 cm (3.7 in) – 13 cm (5.1 in); shoulder height 57 cm (22 in) – 72 cm (28 in); and weight 22 kg (49 lb) – 30 kg (66 lb).

== Diet ==
In the mountain taiga and mountain forest steppe regions of northern Mongolia, the diet of wolves predominantly consists of wild ungulates. Analysis of wolf scats collected in the Khentii Mountain range revealed that wild ungulates made up 89% of the consumed biomass, with Siberian roe deer (Capreolus pygargus) being the most important prey species. Notably, no evidence of domestic ungulates was found in the wolf diet in this near-natural ecosystem, suggesting that a diverse fauna of wild animals is important to limit livestock depredation.

== Range ==
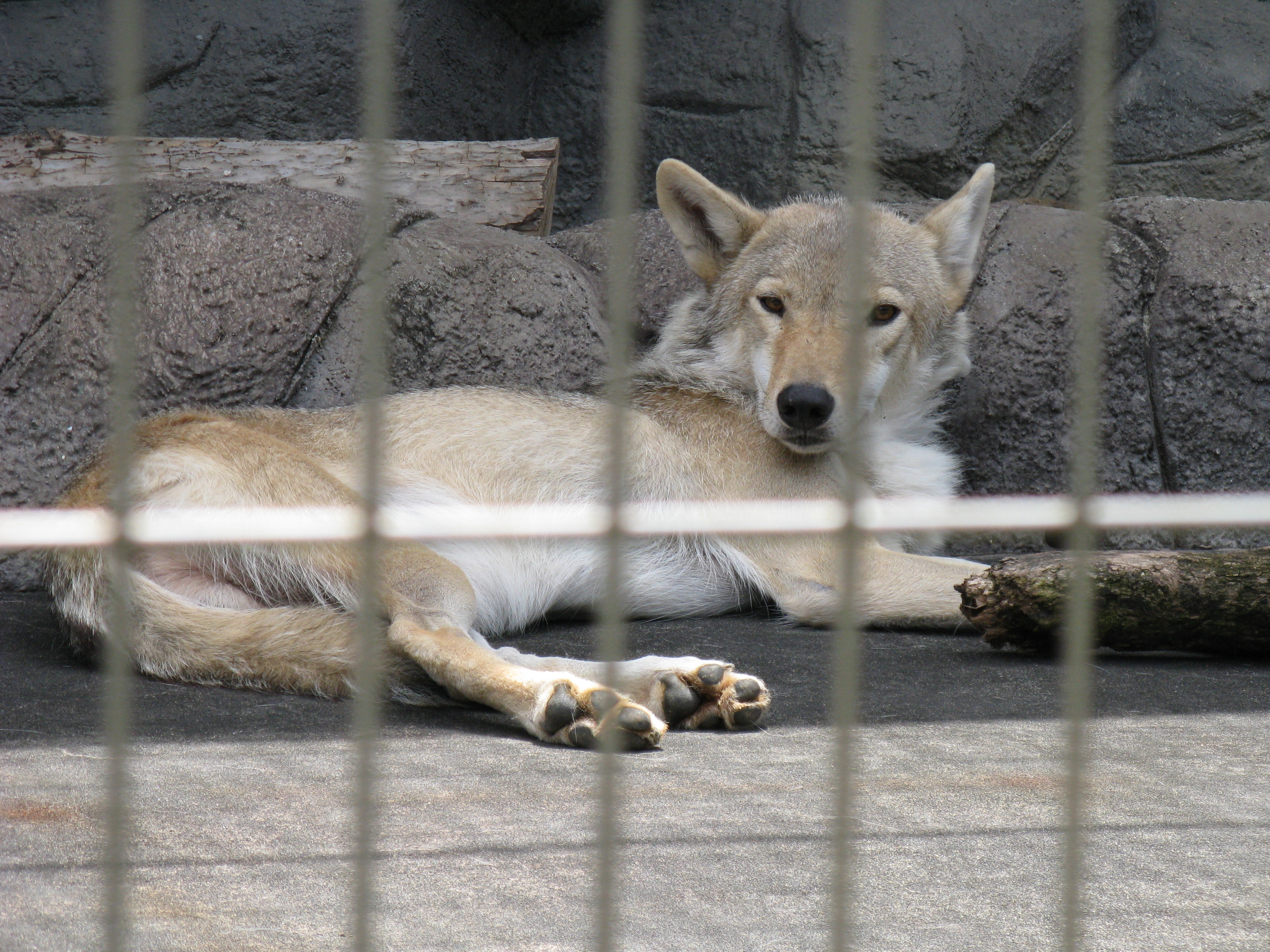
In the Tennoji Zoo, Osaka, Japan

The range of C. l. chanco includes Mongolia, northern and central China, North Korea and the Ussuri region of Russia, which they have expanded into from northern China recently, due to human settlement and its removal of their main competitor, the Siberian tiger. Their range is bounded in the east by the Altai Mountains/Tien shan mountains with C. l. lupus, in the south by the Tibetan Plateau with the Himalayan wolf, and in southern China by a yet to be named wolf subspecies. The taxonomic synonym authors have described their specimens in the following locations: chanco Gray (1863) Chinese Tartary; coreanus Abe (1923) Korea; karanorensis Matschie (1907) Kara-nor in the Gobi Desert; niger Sclater (1874) Hanle in the Indian union territory of Ladakh; and tschillensis Matschie (1907) the coast of Zhili (Zhili is now mainly part of Hebei province).

== Relationship with humans ==
In Mongolia, the wolf is seen as a spirit animal whereas the dog is seen as a family member. Mongolians do not fear the wolf and understand that it is afraid of humans. It is sometimes called "the sheep's assassin". In legend, the Mongolian herders' first father was a wolf from which they had descended, and yet they are required to kill wolves to protect their flocks of sheep. There is sustainable utilization of the wolf's fur in Mongolia.
