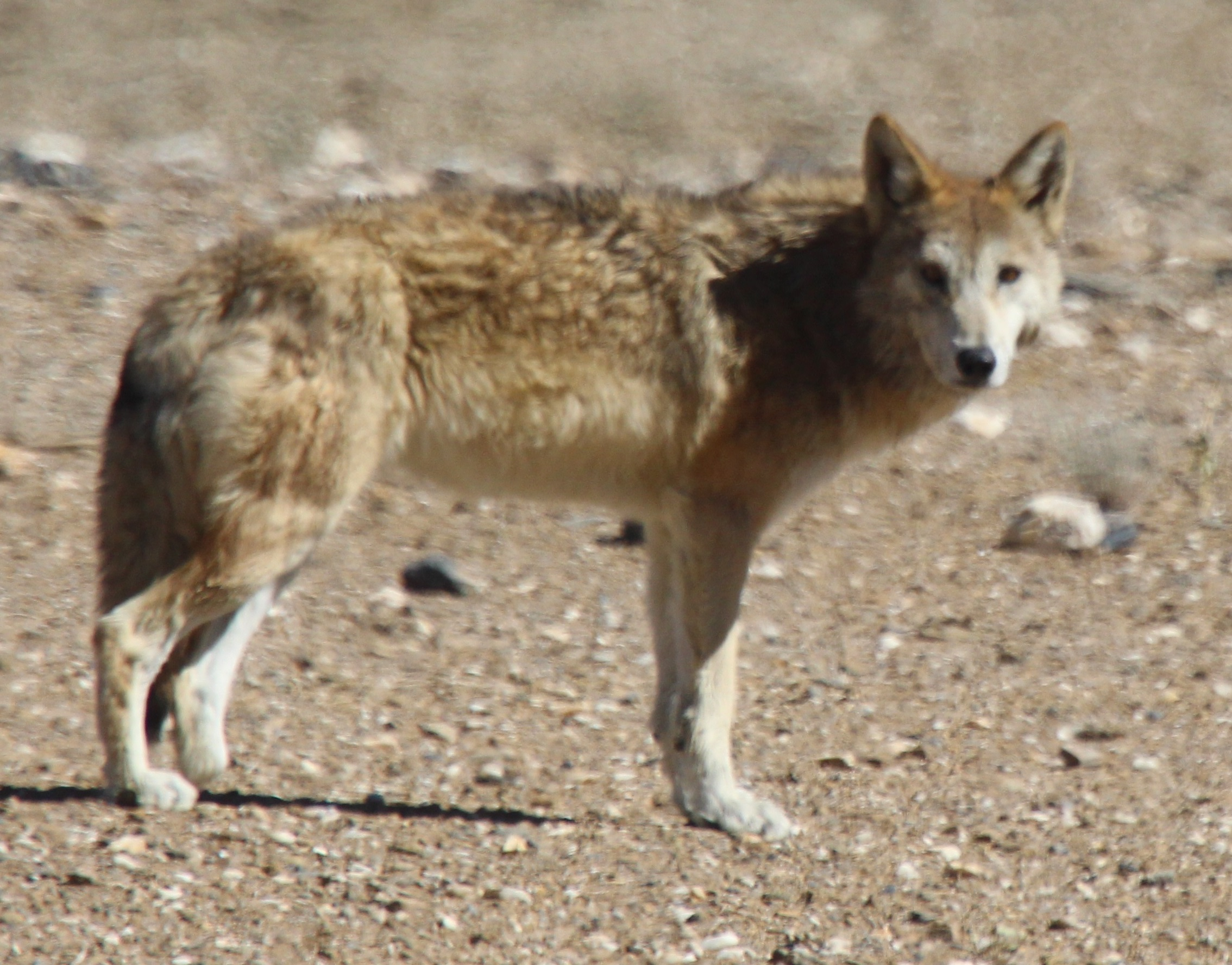
- Himalayan wolf

Conservation status
- Vulnerable (IUCN 3.1)

Scientific classification
- Kingdom: Animalia
- Phylum: Chordata
- Class: Mammalia
- Infraclass: Placentalia
- Order: Carnivora
- Family: Canidae
- Genus: Canis
- Species: C. lupus
- Subspecies: C. l. chanco

Trinomial name
- Canis lupus chanco Gray, 1863
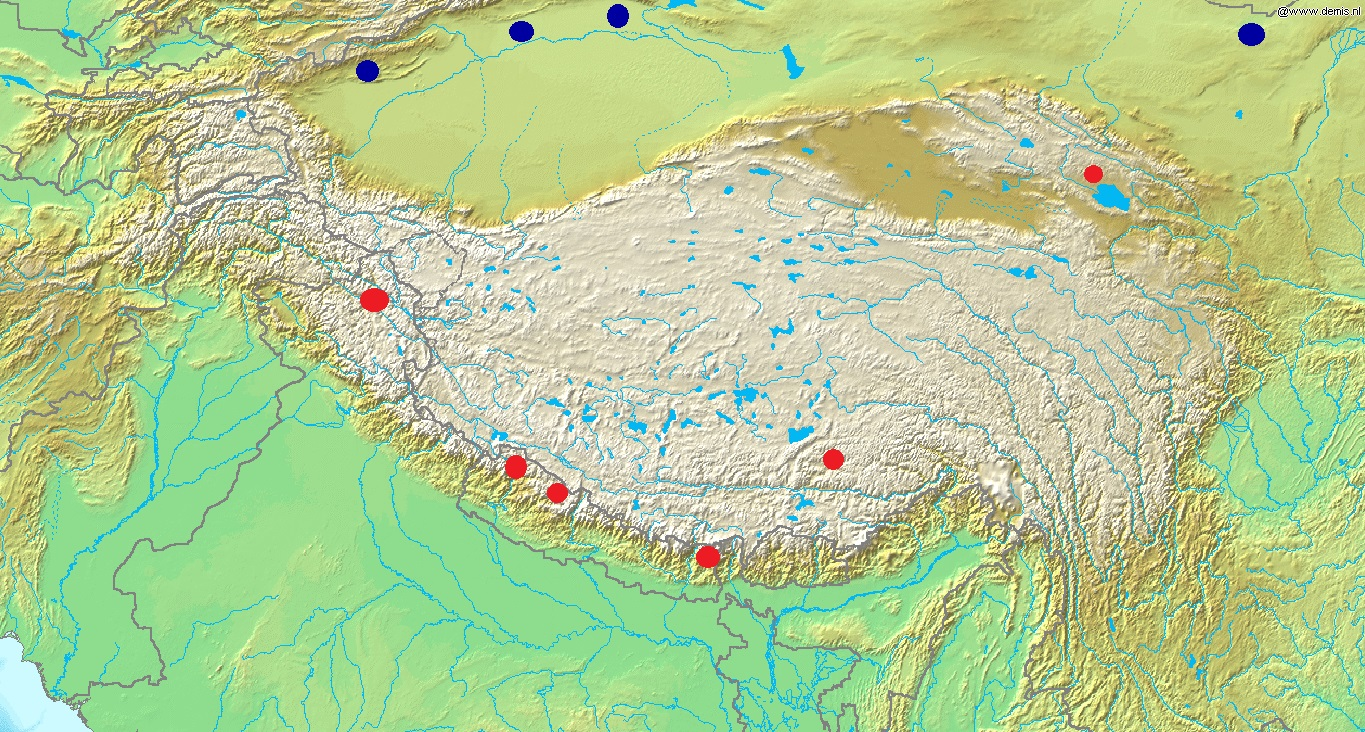
- Himalayan wolf distribution (red dots in highlands) compared with the holarctic grey wolf (blue dots in lowlands)

= Himalayan wolf =

Subspecies of mammal

The Himalayan wolf (Canis lupus chanco) is a canine of debated taxonomy. It is distinguished by its genetic markers, with mitochondrial DNA indicating that it is genetically basal to the Holarctic grey wolf, genetically the same wolf as the Tibetan and Mongolian wolf, and has an association with the African wolf (Canis lupaster). No striking morphological differences are seen between the wolves from the Himalayas and those from Tibet. The Himalayan wolf lineage can be found living in Ladakh in the Himalayas, the Tibetan Plateau, and the mountains of Central Asia predominantly above 4,000 m (13,000 ft) in elevation because it has adapted to a low-oxygen environment, compared with other wolves that are found only at lower elevations.

Some authors have proposed the reclassification of this lineage as a separate species. In 2019, a workshop hosted by the IUCN/SSC Canid Specialist Group noted that the Himalayan wolf's distribution included the Himalayan range and the Tibetan Plateau. The group recommends that this wolf lineage be known as the "Himalayan wolf" and be classified as Canis lupus chanco until a genetic analysis of the holotypes is available. The Himalayan wolf lacks a proper morphological analysis. The wolves in India and Nepal are listed on CITES Appendix I as endangered due to international trade.

== Taxonomy ==
Canis chanco was the scientific name proposed by John Edward Gray in 1863, who described a skin of a wolf that was shot in Chinese Tartary. This specimen was classified as a wolf subspecies Canis lupus chanco by St. George Jackson Mivart in 1880. In the 19th and 20th centuries, several taxonomical nomenclature was given to various zoological specimens:

- Canis niger by Philip Sclater in 1874 based on pair of wolves bought alive from Tatar traders at the foot of the Lanak Pass.
- Lupus filchneri by Paul Matschie in 1907 from a wolf skin from Xining in China's Qinghai province. It had been collected by Wilhelm Filchner during an expedition to China and Tibet in 1903–1905.
- Lupus karanorensis by Matschie in 1907 based on a skin and a skull of a wolf that was shot in an oasis near Dunhuang in China in 1894.
- Lupus tschiliensis by Matschie in 1907 from a skull of a wolf specimen that was shot in the coastal region of China's Zhili province.
- Canis lupus coreanus by Yoshio Abe in 1923 based on a wolf specimen obtained from the vicinity of Seoul in the Korean Peninsula.

In 1938, Glover Morrill Allen classified these specimens as synonyms for the subspecies C. l. chanco. In 1941, Reginald Pocock corroborated this assessment after reviewing wolf skins and skulls in the collection of the Natural History Museum, London. In 2005, W. Christopher Wozencraft also listed C. l. niger, C. l. filchneri, C. l. karanorensis, and C. l. tschiliensis as synonyms for C. l. chanco.

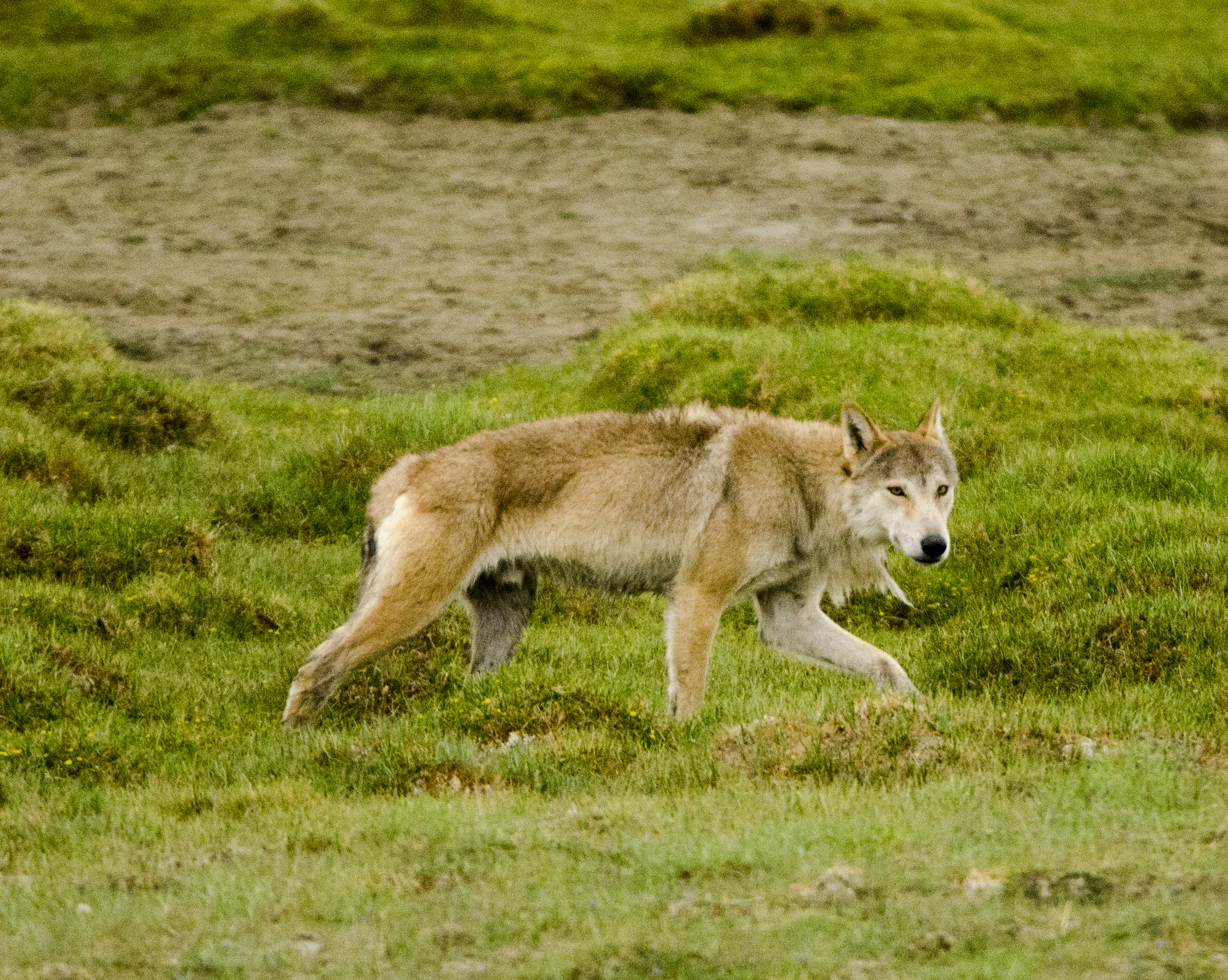
Himalayan wolf

Canis himalayensis was proposed by Aggarwal et al. in 2007 for wolf specimens from the Indian Himalayas that differed in mitochondrial DNA (mDNA) from specimens collected from other parts of India. In April 2009, it was proposed as a distinct wolf species through the nomenclature specialist on the CITES animals committee based on a single study that relied on only a limited number of museum and zoo samples that may not have been representative of the wild population. The committee recommended against this proposal, but suggested that the name be entered into the CITES species database as a synonym for Canis lupus. The committee stated that the classification was for conservation purposes only, and did not "reflect the latest state of taxonomic knowledge", and called for further fieldwork.

As per a 2018 report, this genetic lineage showed a 3.9% divergence in the mDNA cytochrome b gene when compared with the Holarctic grey wolf (Canis lupus), which may justify it being classified as a distinct species. In 2019, a workshop hosted by the IUCN/SSC Canid Specialist Group noted that the Himalayan wolf's distribution included the Himalayan range and the Tibetan Plateau. The group determined that the earliest available Latin name is Canis chanco (Gray, 1863), but the geographic location of the holotype is unclear. The group recommends that this wolf lineage be known as the "Himalayan wolf" and classified as Canis lupus chanco until a genetic analysis of the holotypes is available. In 2020, recent research on the Himalayan wolf genome indicates that it warrants species-level recognition under the Unified Species Concept, the Differential Fitness Species Concept, and the Biological Species Concept. It was identified as an evolutionary significant unit that warranted assignment onto the IUCN Red List for its protection.

== Characteristics ==
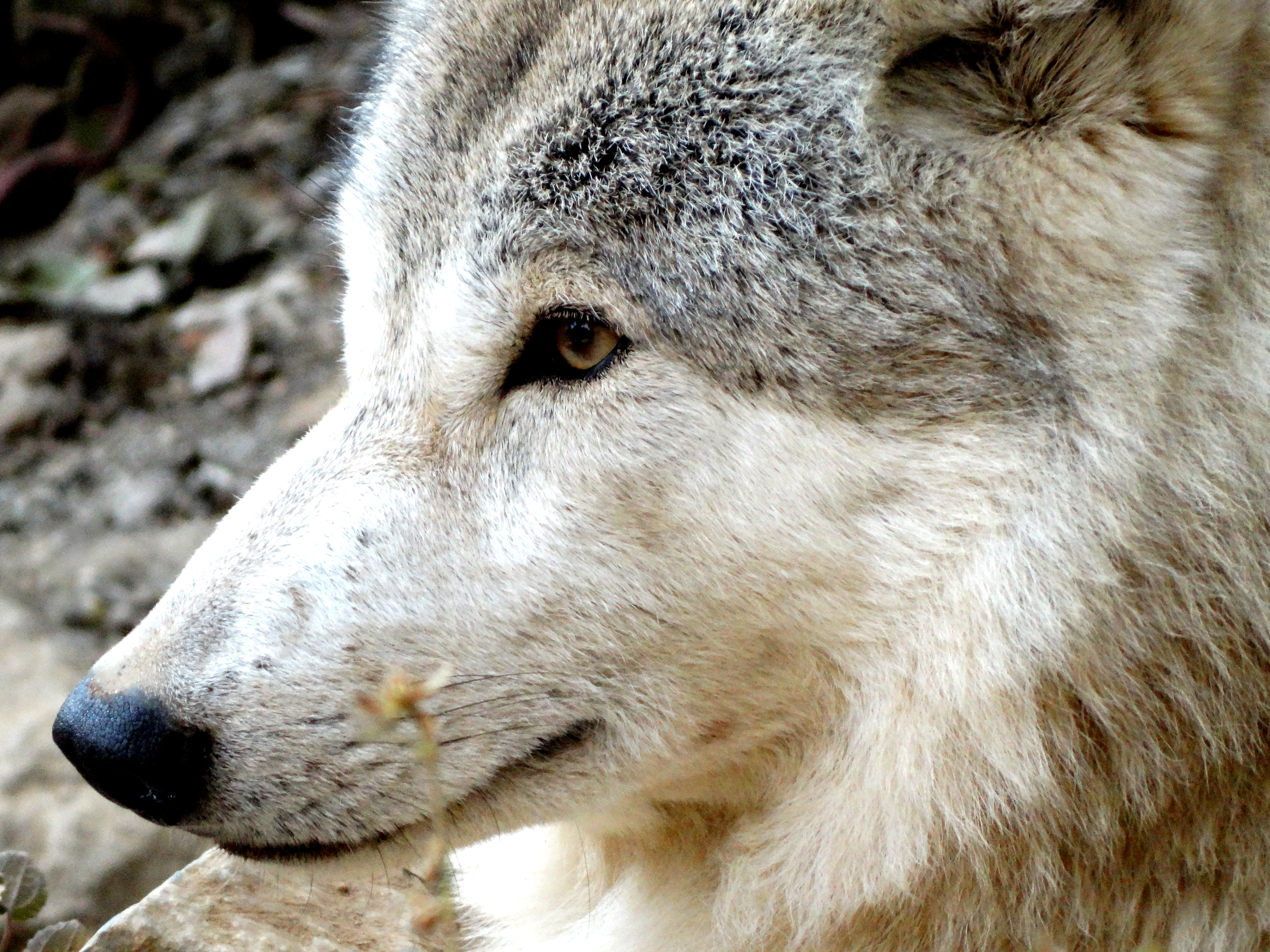
Himalayan wolf profile

The Himalayan wolf has a thick, woolly fur that is dull earthy-brown on the back and tail, and yellowish-white on the face, underside, and limbs. It has closely spaced black speckles on the muzzle, below the eyes, and on the upper cheeks and ears.

It is larger than the Indian and common European wolves, and reaches 110 to 180 cm (45 to 70 in) in length, 68 to 76 cm (27 to 30 in) tall at the shoulder, and weighs around 30 to 55 kg (66 to 121 lb) on average.

The heart of the Himalayan wolf can withstand the low oxygen levels at high elevations. It has a strong selection for RYR2, a gene that initiates cardiac excitation.

== Phylogeography ==
The mitochondrial DNA of 27 wolves from the Himalayas and the Tibetan Plateau was compared in 2004. Results indicate that five related haplotypes formed a clade that is basal to all other wolves. This clade included one sample from Ladakh, nine from the Spiti Valley in Himachal Pradesh, four from Nepal, and two from Tibet. The Himalayan wolf clade diverged from other canids 800,000 years ago. Seven wolves from Kashmir did not fall into this clade. The mtDNA of 18 captive wolves in the Padmaja Naidu Himalayan Zoological Park was analysed in 2007. Results showed that they shared a common female ancestor. As this study was based on captive-bred zoo specimens that had descended from only two females, these samples were not considered to be representative. Additionally, the wolf population in the Kashmir Valley is known to have recently arrived in that area. Subsequent genetic research showed that wolf samples from Tibet are genetically basal to the Holarctic gray wolf. Its MT-ND4L gene commences with the base pairs GTG, whereas all other canids commence with ATG. Results of whole genome sequencing showed that it is the most genetically divergent wolf.

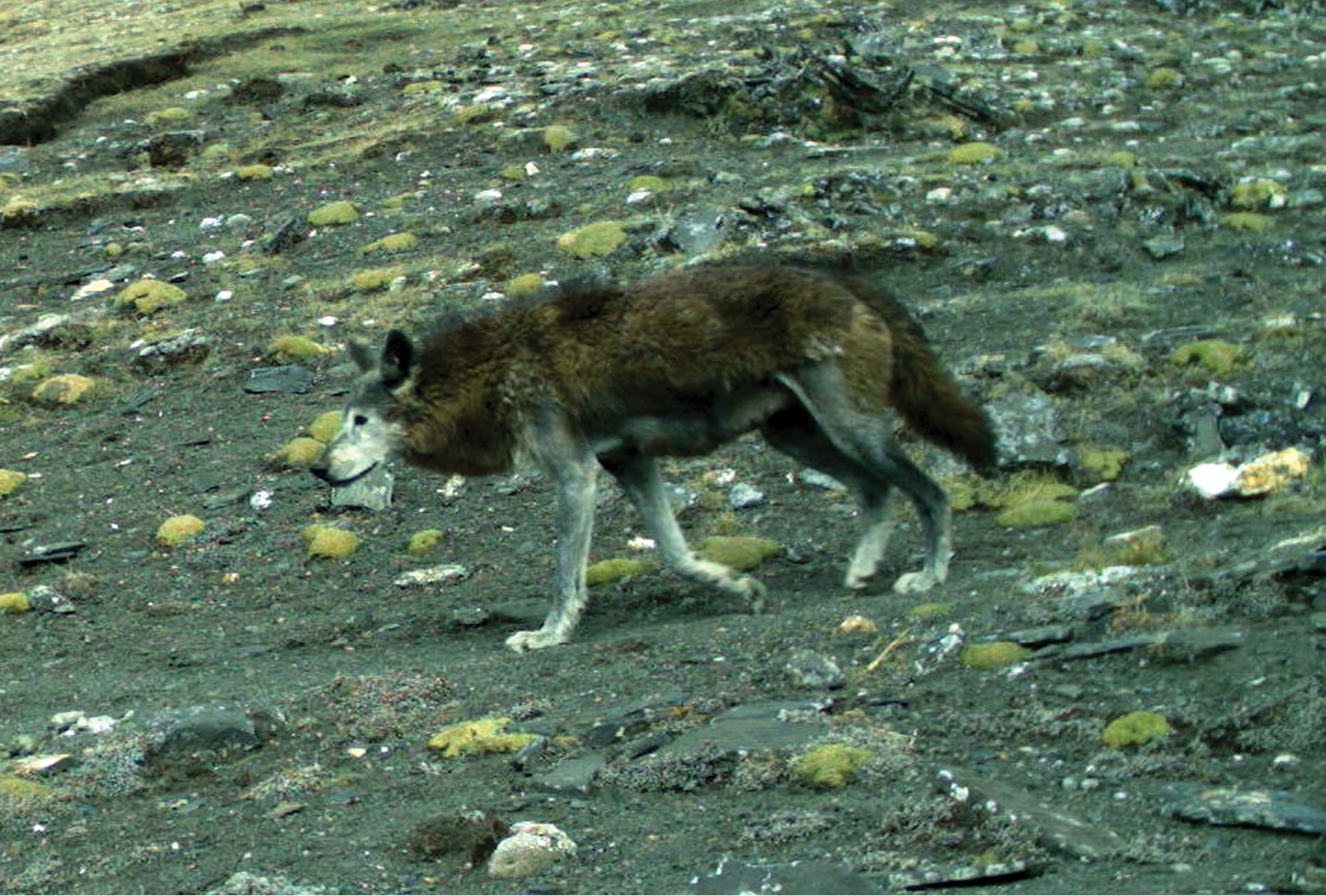
Himalayan wolf in Annapurna Conservation Area

Analysis of scat samples from two wolves collected in upper Dolpo in Nepal matched the Himalayan wolf. Fecal remains of four wolves collected in the upper Mustang region of the Annapurna Conservation Area also fell within the Himalayan wolf clade but formed a separate haplotype from those previously studied.

The Himalayan wolf population in Tibet declined over the past 25,000 years and suffered a historical population bottleneck. Glaciation during the Last Glacial Maximum may have caused habitat loss, genetic isolation, and ancient inbreeding. The population in Qinghai had grown, though, showing a gene flow of 16% from Chinese indigenous dogs and 2% of the dingo's genome. It probably recolonised the Tibetan Plateau. The Himalayan wolf contrasts with the wolves living at lower elevations in Inner Mongolia, Mongolia, and Xinjiang province. Some wolves in China and Mongolia also fall within the Himalayan wolf clade, indicating a common maternal ancestor and a wide distribution. There was evidence of hybridization with the grey wolf at Sachyat-Ertash in the Issyk-Kul region of Kyrgyzstan, and of introgression from either the grey wolf or the dog into the Himalayan wolf in Nepal.

A genomic study on China's wolves included museum specimens of wolves from southern China that were collected between 1963 and 1988. The wolves in the study formed three clades: north Asian wolves that included those from northern China and eastern Russia, wolves from the Tibetan Plateau, and a unique population from southern China. One specimen located as far southeast as Jiangxi province shows evidence of being admixed between Tibetan-related wolves and other wolves in China.

Phylogenetic tree of Canis lupus with timing in years (Note: For a full set of supporting references refer to the note (a) in the phylotree at Evolution of the wolf#Wolf-like canids)

- 250,000
  - 120,000
    - 80,000
      - 31,000
        - Dog
        - Holarctic gray wolf
      - Late Pleistocene wolf†
    - Indian plains wolf
  - Himalayan wolf

DNA sequences can be mapped to reveal a phylogenetic tree that represents evolutionary relationships, with each branch point representing the divergence of two lineages from a common ancestor. On this tree, the term "basal" is used to describe a lineage that forms a branch diverging nearest to the common ancestor.

=== Relationship to the Indian lowland wolf ===
In 2021, a study compared both the mitochondrial DNA and the nuclear DNA (from the cell nucleus) from the wolves of the Himalayas with those of the wolves from the lowlands of the Indian subcontinent. The genomic analyses indicate that the Himalayan wolf and the Indian lowland wolf were genetically distinct from one another. These wolves were also genetically distinct from – and genetically basal to – the other wolf populations across the northern hemisphere. These other wolves form a single mitochondrial clade, indicating that they originated from a single expansion from one region within the last 100,000 years. However, the study indicated that the Himalayan wolf had separated from this lineage 496,000 years ago, and the Indian lowland wolf 200,000 years ago.

=== Admixture with an unknown wolf-like canid ===
The Tibetan Mastiff breed was able to adapt to the extreme highland conditions of the Tibetan Plateau very quickly, comparably to other mammals such as the yak, Tibetan antelope, snow leopard, and wild boar. The Tibetan Mastiff's ability to avoid hypoxia in high elevations due to its higher hemoglobin levels compared to low-altitude dogs, was due to prehistoric interbreeding with the wolves of Tibet.

In 2020, a genomic analysis indicates that the wolves of the Himalayas and the Tibetan Plateau are closely related. These wolves have an admixed history which includes gray wolves, dogs, and a ghost population of an unknown wolf-like canid. This ghost population is deeply-diverged from modern Holarctic wolves and dogs, has contributed 39% to the Himalayan wolf's nuclear genome, and contributed the EPAS1 allele which can be found in both Himalayan wolves and dogs which allows them to live in high altitudes.

Domestic dogs exhibit diverse coat colours and patterns. In many mammals, different colour patterns are the result of the regulation of the Agouti gene, which can cause hair follicles to switch from making black or brown pigments to yellow or nearly white pigments. The most common coat pattern found in modern wolves is agouti, in which the upperside of the body has banded hairs and the underside exhibits lighter shading. The colour yellow is dominant to the colour black and is found in dogs across much of the world and the dingo in Australia.

In 2021, a study of whole genome sequences taken from dogs and wolves focused on the genetic relationships between them based on coat colour. The study found that most dog colour haplotypes were similar to most wolf haplotypes, however dominant yellow in dogs was closely related to white in arctic wolves from North America. This result suggests a common origin for dominant yellow in dogs and white in wolves but without recent gene flow, because this clade was found to be basal to the golden jackal and genetically distinct from all other canids. The most recent common ancestor of the golden jackal and the wolf lineage dates back to 2 million YBP. The study proposes that 35,000 YBP there was genetic introgression into the Late Pleistocene grey wolf from a ghost population of an extinct canid which had diverged from the grey wolf lineage over 2 million YBP. This colour diversity could be found 35,000 YBP in wolves and 9,500 YBP in dogs. A closely related haplotype exists among those wolves of Tibet which possess yellow shading in their coats. The study explains the colour relationships between modern dogs and wolves, white wolves from North America, yellow dogs, and yellowish wolves from Tibet. The study concludes that during the Late Pleistocene, natural selection laid the genetic foundation for modern coat colour diversity in dogs and wolves.

=== Relationship with the African golden wolf ===
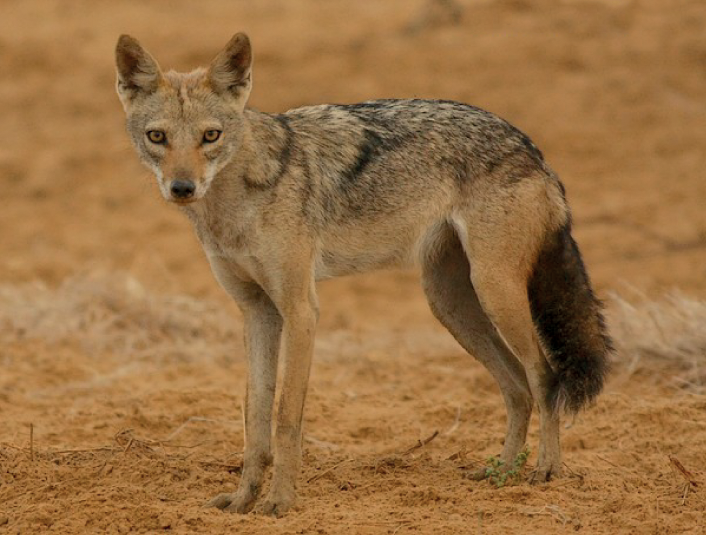
African wolf

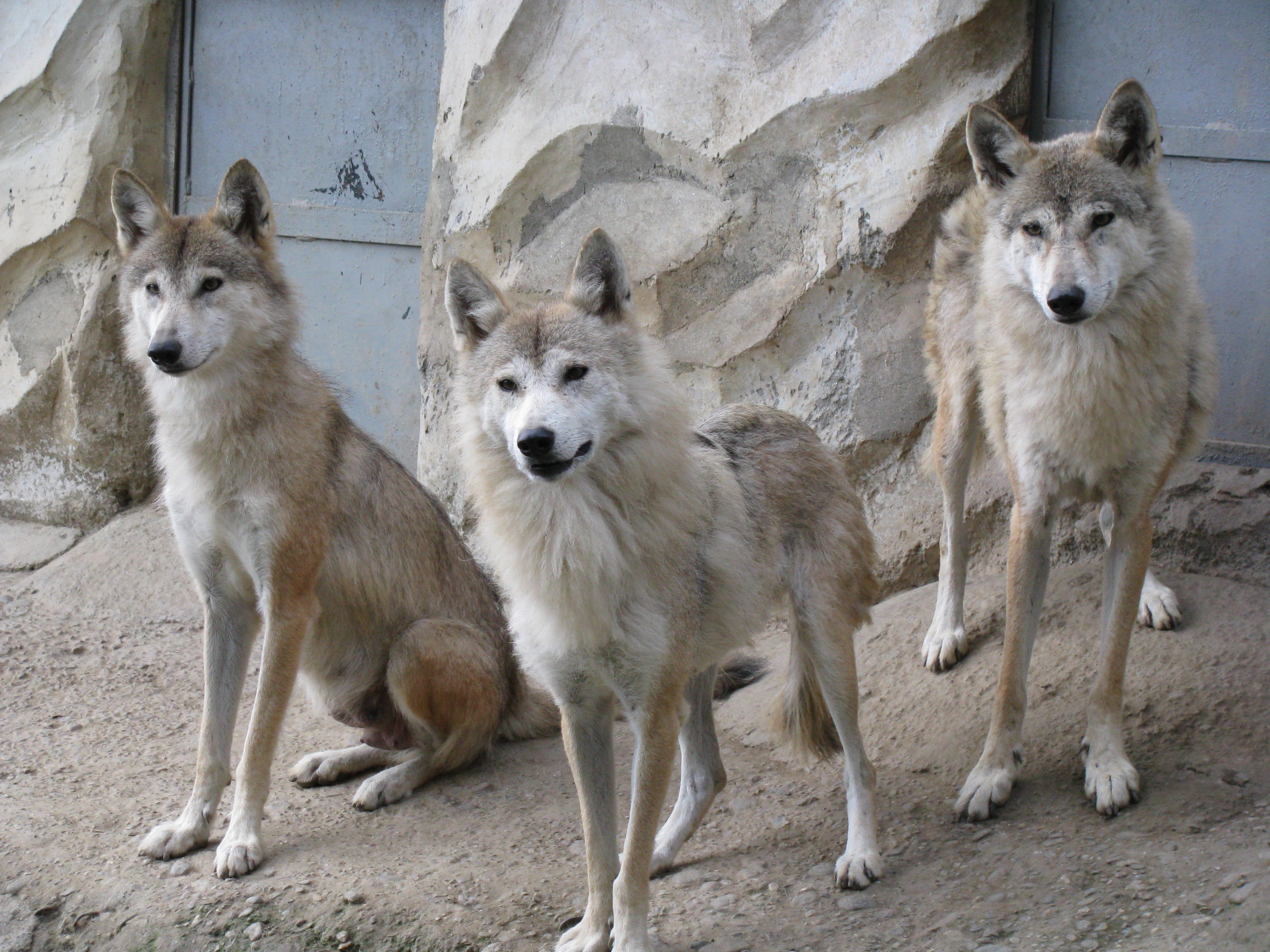
Himalayan wolves in the Padmaja Naidu Himalayan Zoological Park in Darjeeling

In 2011, the Himalayan, Indian and African wolves were proposed to represent ancient wolf lineages, with the African wolf having colonised Africa prior to the Northern Hemisphere radiation of the Holarctic gray wolf.

Two studies of the mitochondrial genome of both modern and extinct gray wolves (Canis lupus) have been conducted, but these excluded the genetically divergent lineages of the Himalayan wolf and the Indian wolf. The ancient specimens were radiocarbon dated and stratigraphically dated, and together with DNA sequences, a time-based phylogenetic tree was generated for wolves. The study inferred that the most recent common ancestor for all other Canis lupus specimens – modern and extinct – was 80,000 years before present. An analysis of the Himalayan wolf mitochondrial genome indicates that the Himalayan wolf diverged between 740,000 and 691,000 years ago from the lineage that would become the Holarctic gray wolf.

Between 2011 and 2015, two mDNA studies found that the Himalayan wolf and Indian gray wolf were genetically closer to the African golden wolf than they were to the Holarctic gray wolf. From 2017, two studies based on mDNA, and X-chromosome and Y-chromosome markers taken from the cell nucleus, indicate that the Himalayan wolf is genetically basal to the Holarctic gray wolf. Its degree of divergence from the Holarctic gray wolf is similar to the degree of divergence of the African wolf from the Holarctic wolf. The Himalayan wolf shares a maternal lineage with the African wolf. It possesses a unique paternal lineage that falls between the gray wolf and the African wolf. The results of these two studies imply that the Himalayan wolf distribution range extends from the Himalayan range north across the Tibetan Plateau up to the Qinghai Lake region in China's Qinghai Province.

In 2018, whole genome sequencing was used to compare members of the genus Canis. The African golden wolf was found to be the descendant of a genetically admixed canid of 72% gray wolf and 28% Ethiopian wolf ancestry. The Ethiopian wolf does not share the single-nucleotide polymorphisms that confer hypoxia adaptation with the Himalayan wolf. The adaptation of the Ethiopian wolf to living in high elevations may occur at other single-nucleotide polymorphism locations. This indicates that the Ethiopian wolf's adaptation has not been inherited by descent from a common ancestor shared with the Himalayan wolf.

== Distribution and habitat ==
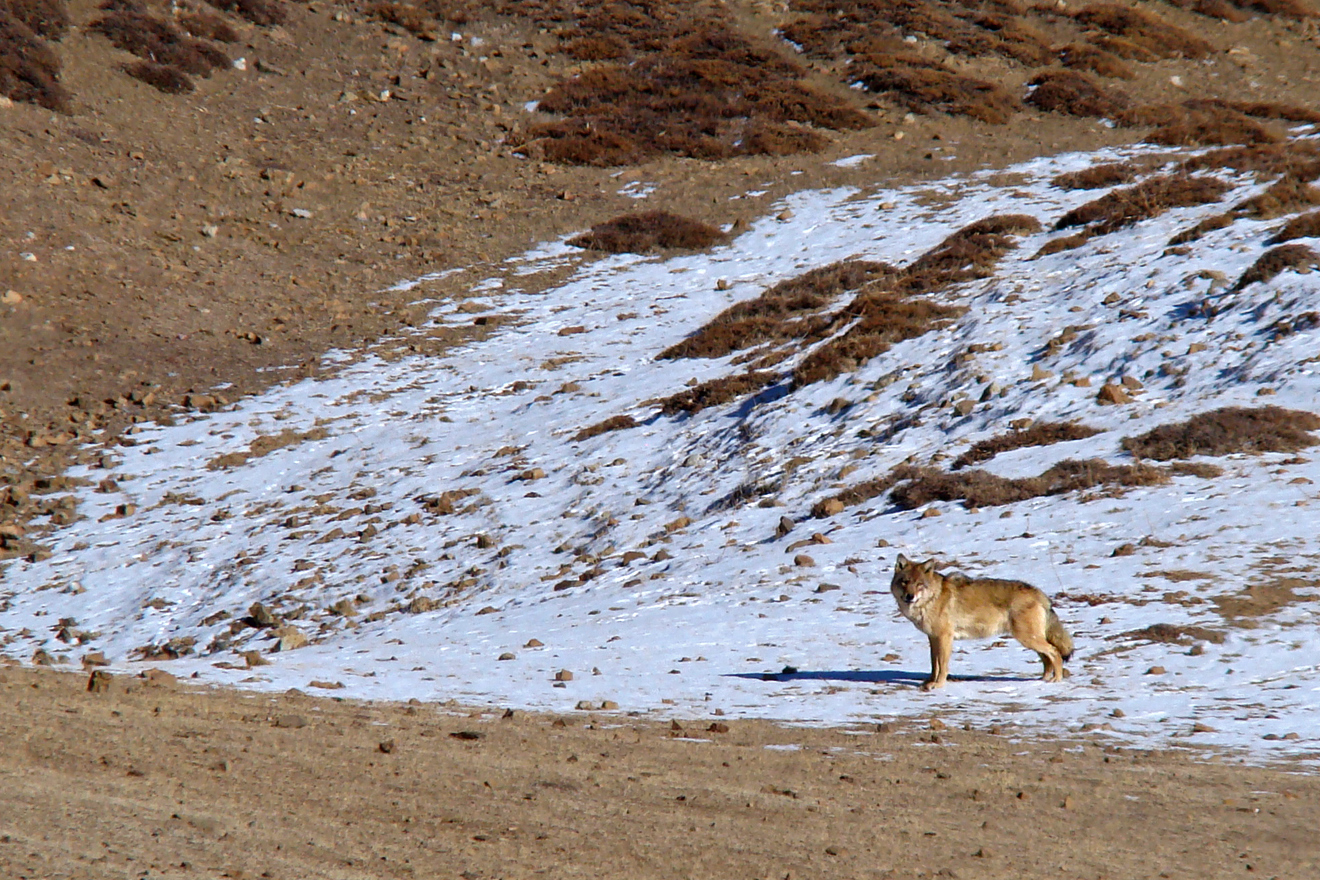
Himalayan wolf in Spiti Valley

In China, the Himalayan wolf lives on the Tibetan Plateau in the provinces of Gansu, Qinghai, Tibet, and western Sichuan.

In North India, the Himalayan wolf occurs in the union territory of Ladakh and in the Lahaul and Spiti region in northeastern Himachal Pradesh. In 2004, the Himalayan wolf population in India was estimated to consist of 350 individuals ranging across an area of about 70,000 km^{2} (27,000 sq mi). Between 2005 and 2008, it was sighted in the alpine meadows above the treeline northeast of Nanda Devi National Park in Uttarakhand. In 2013, a wolf was photographed by a camera trap installed at an elevation around 3,500 m (11,500 ft) near the Sunderdhunga Glacier in Uttarakhand's Bageshwar district.

The Nepal Himalayas provide an important habitat refuge for the Himalayan wolf, and it was recorded in Api Nampa Conservation Area, Upper Dolpo, Humla, Manaslu, Upper Mustang, and the Kanchenjunga Conservation Area in Nepal.

== Behaviour and ecology ==
The howls of the Himalayan wolf have lower frequencies, unmodulated frequencies, and are shorter in duration compared to Holarctic wolf howls. The Himalayan and North African wolves have the most acoustically distinct howls and differ significantly from each other and the Holarctic wolves.

=== Diet ===
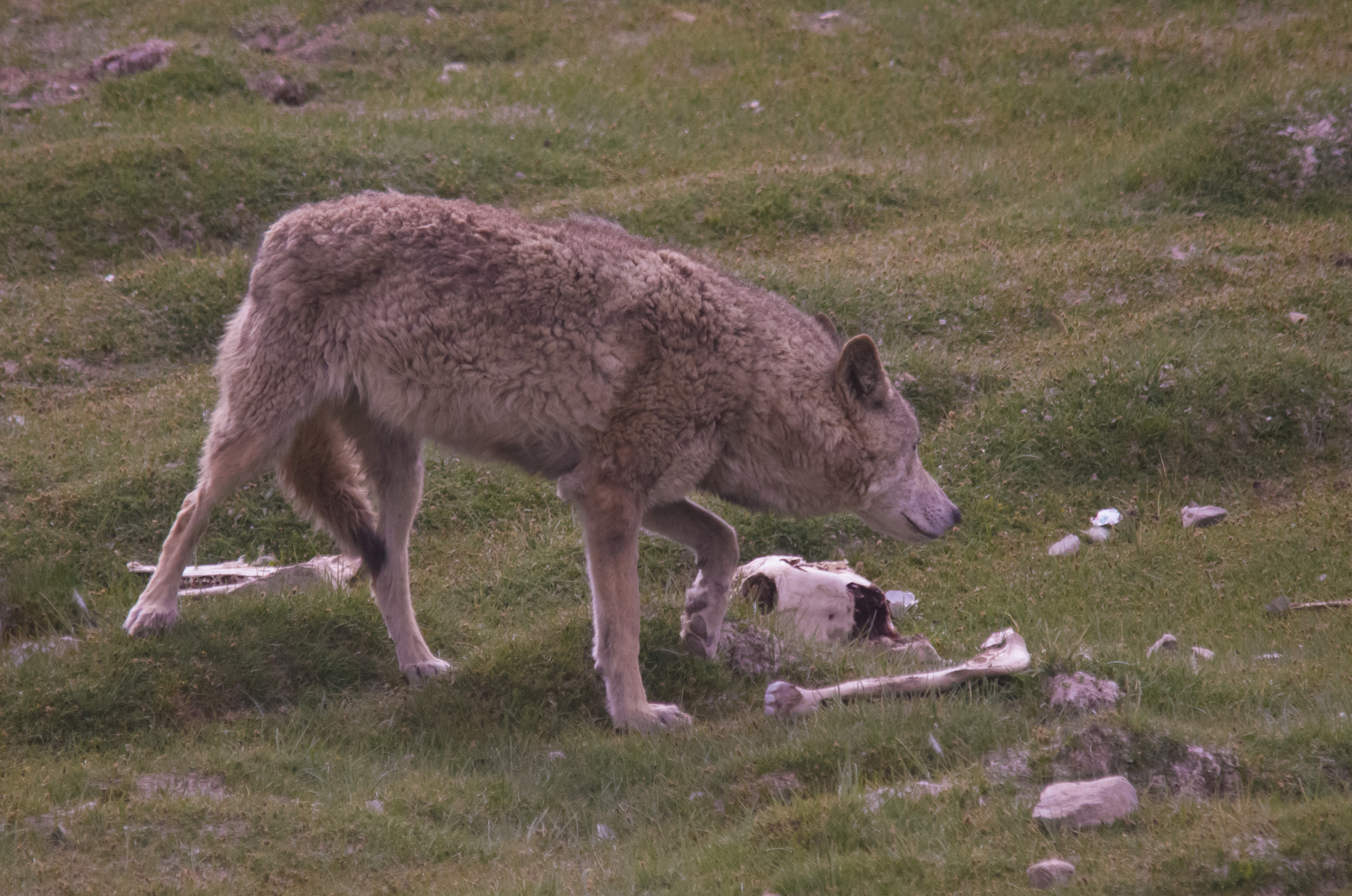
Himalayan wolf with remains of an ungulate in Ladakh

The Himalayan wolf usually prefers the smaller Tibetan gazelle over the larger white-lipped deer, and the plains-dwelling Tibetan gazelle over the cliff-dwelling blue sheep. Supplementary diet includes the small Himalayan marmot, big-eared pika and woolly hare. Himalayan wolves avoid livestock where wild prey is available, but habitat encroachment and the depletion of wild prey populations might lead to conflict with herders. Hence, maintaining wild prey populations is key towards determining the diet and behaviour of the wolves. Other recorded prey species are Bactrian deer, Yarkand deer, Tibetan red deer, Siberian roe deer, Siberian ibex, Tibetan wild ass, Przewalski's horse, wild yak, markhor, argali and urial.

Historical sources indicate that wolves occasionally killed children in Ladakh and Lahaul. Within the proposed Gya-Miru Wildlife Sanctuary in Ladakh, the intensity of livestock depredation assessed in three villages found that Himalayan wolves were the most prevalent predators, accounting for 60% of the total livestock losses, followed by the snow leopard and Eurasian lynx. The most frequent prey were domestic goats (32%), followed by sheep (30%), yaks (15%), and horses (13%). The wolves killed horses significantly more, and goats less, than would be expected from their relative abundance.

== Conservation ==
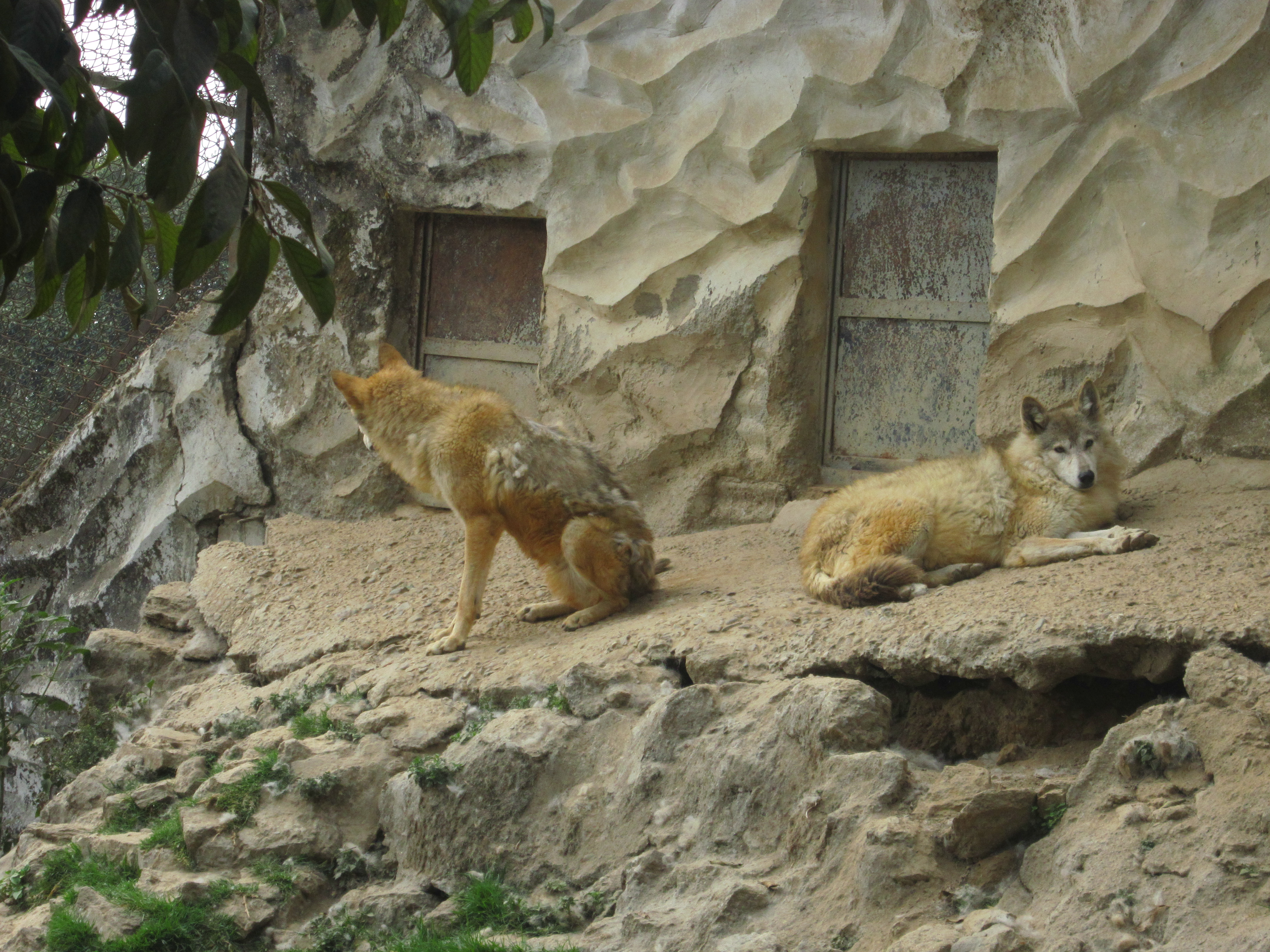
A pair of wolves at the Padmaja Naidu Himalayan Zoological Park in Darjeeling

The wolf in Bhutan, India, Nepal, and Pakistan is listed on CITES Appendix I. In India, the wolf is protected under Schedule I of the Wildlife Protection Act, 1972, which prohibits hunting; a zoo needs a permission from the government to acquire a wolf. It is listed as endangered in Jammu and Kashmir, Himachal Pradesh, and Uttarakhand, where a large portion of the wolf population lives outside the protected area network. Lack of information about its basic ecology in this landscape is an obstacle for developing a conservation plan. In Nepal, it is protected under Schedule I of the National Parks and Wildlife Conservation Act, 2029 (1973) prohibiting hunting it. In China, the wolf is listed as vulnerable in the Red List of China's Vertebrates, and hunting it is banned.

=== In captivity ===
In 2007, 18 Himalayan wolves were kept for breeding in two Indian zoos. They were captured in the wild and were kept at the Padmaja Naidu Himalayan Zoological Park in West Bengal, and in the Kufri Zoo in Himachal Pradesh.
