= Tartary =

Historical term for northern and central Asia

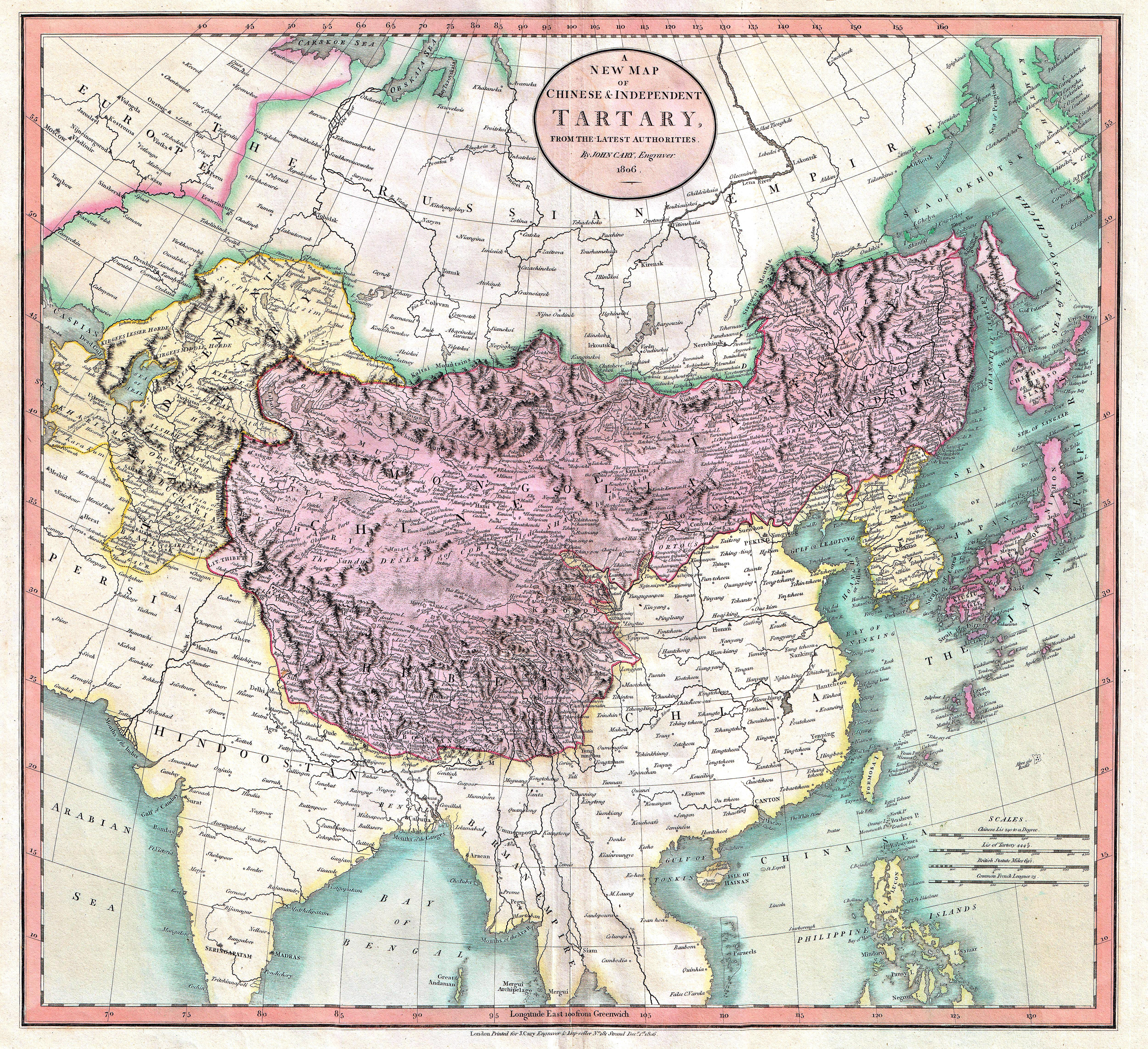
Cartographer John Cary's map of independent Tartary (in yellow) and Chinese Tartary (in violet), in 1808.

Tartary (Latin: Tartaria; French: Tartarie; German: Tartarei; Russian: Тартария, romanized: Tartariya) or Tatary (Russian: Татария, romanized: Tatariya) was a blanket term used in Western European literature and cartography for a vast part of Asia bounded by the Caspian Sea, the Ural Mountains, the Pacific Ocean, and the northern borders of Medieval China, India, and Persia, at a time when this region was largely unknown to European geographers.

The active use of the toponym (place name) can be traced from the 13th to the 19th centuries. In European sources, Tartary became the most common name for Central Asia that had no connection with the real polities or ethnic groups of the region; until the 19th century, European knowledge of the area remained extremely scarce and fragmentary. In modern English-speaking tradition, the region formerly known as Tartary is usually called Inner Asia or Central Eurasia. Much of this area consists of arid plains, the main nomadic population of which in the past was engaged in animal husbandry.

Ignorance surrounding Tartary's use as a place name has spawned pseudohistoric conspiracy theories including ideas of a "hidden past" and "mud floods". Such theories assert that Tartary (or the "Tartarian Empire") is a lost civilization with advanced technology and culture. This ignores the well-documented history of Asia, to which Tartary refers. In the present day, the Tartary region spans from central Afghanistan to northern Kazakhstan, as well as areas in present Mongolia, China, and the Russian Far East in "Chinese Tartary".

== Geography and history ==
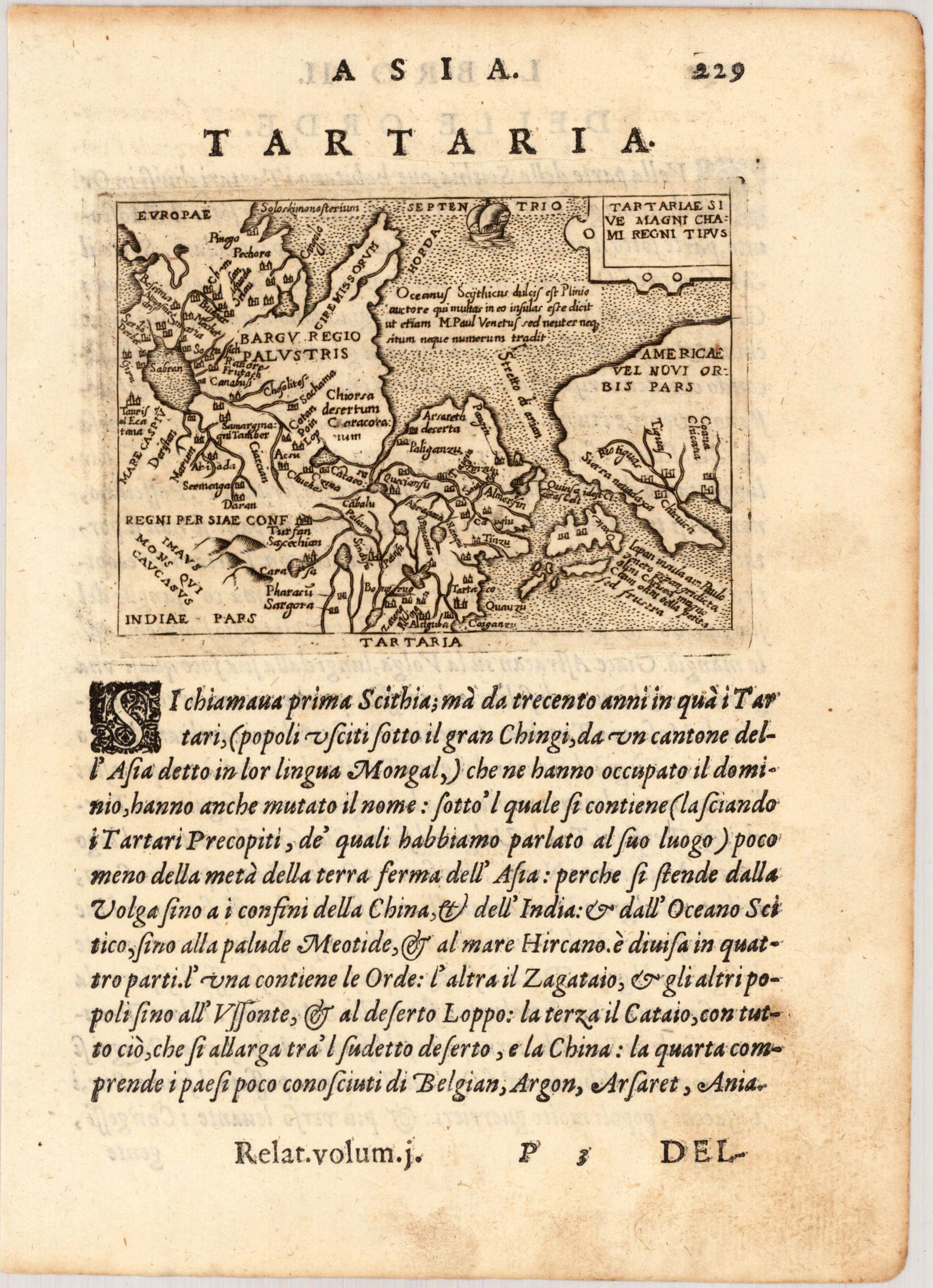
Tartaria map and description by Giovanni Botero from his "Relationi universali" (Brescia, 1599).

Knowledge of Manchuria, Siberia, and Central Asia in Europe before the 18th century was limited. The entire area was known simply as "Tartary" and its inhabitants as "Tartars". In the early modern period, as understanding of the geography increased, Europeans began to subdivide Tartary into sections with prefixes denoting the name of the ruling power or the geographical location. Thus, Siberia was Great Tartary or Russian Tartary, the Crimean Khanate was Little Tartary, Manchuria was Chinese Tartary, and western Central Asia (before becoming Russian Central Asia) was known as Independent Tartary. But by the 17th century, largely under the influence of Catholic missionary writings, the word "Tartar" came to refer to the Manchu people and "Tartary" to the lands they ruled.

European opinions of the area were often unfavorable, and reflected the legacy of the Mongol invasions that originated from the region. The term originated in the wake of the widespread devastation spread by the Mongol Empire. The adding of an extra "r" to "Tatar" was suggestive of Tartarus, a Hell-like realm in Greek mythology. In the 18th century, conceptions of Siberia or Tartary and its inhabitants as "barbarous" by Enlightenment-era writers tied into contemporary concepts of civilization, savagery, and racism.

But some Europeans saw Tartary as a possible source of spiritual knowledge lacking in contemporary European society. Theosophist writer Tallapragada Subba Row quotes Emanuel Swedenborg as having advised, "Seek for the Lost Word among the hierophants of Tartary, China, and Tibet."

=== Decline ===
The use of "Tartary" declined as the region became more known to European geographers, but was still used long into the 19th century. Ethnographical data collected by Jesuit missionaries in China contributed to the replacement of "Chinese Tartary" with Manchuria in European geography by the early 18th century. Egor Meyendorff's and Alexander von Humboldt's voyages into this region gave rise to the term Central Asia in the early 19th century as well as supplementary terms such as Inner Asia, and Russian eastward expansionism led to the term "Siberia" being coined for the Asian half of the Russian Empire.

By the mid-19th century, the use of Tartary as a term for Siberia and Central Asia had waned. However, it lent the title to Peter Fleming's 1936 book News from Tartary, which detailed his travels in Central Asia.

== Tartaria conspiracy theory ==
Misinterpretations of Tartary as an empire distinct from the Mongol Empire, rather than as an archaic name for Central Asia, gave rise to a conspiracy theory alleging the existence of an advanced "Tartarian Empire".

== See also ==
- Cossacks
- Eurasian Steppe
- Golden Horde
- Crimean Khanate
- Tatars
- Tatar confederation
