= Chinese Turkestan =

Historical region in Central Asia

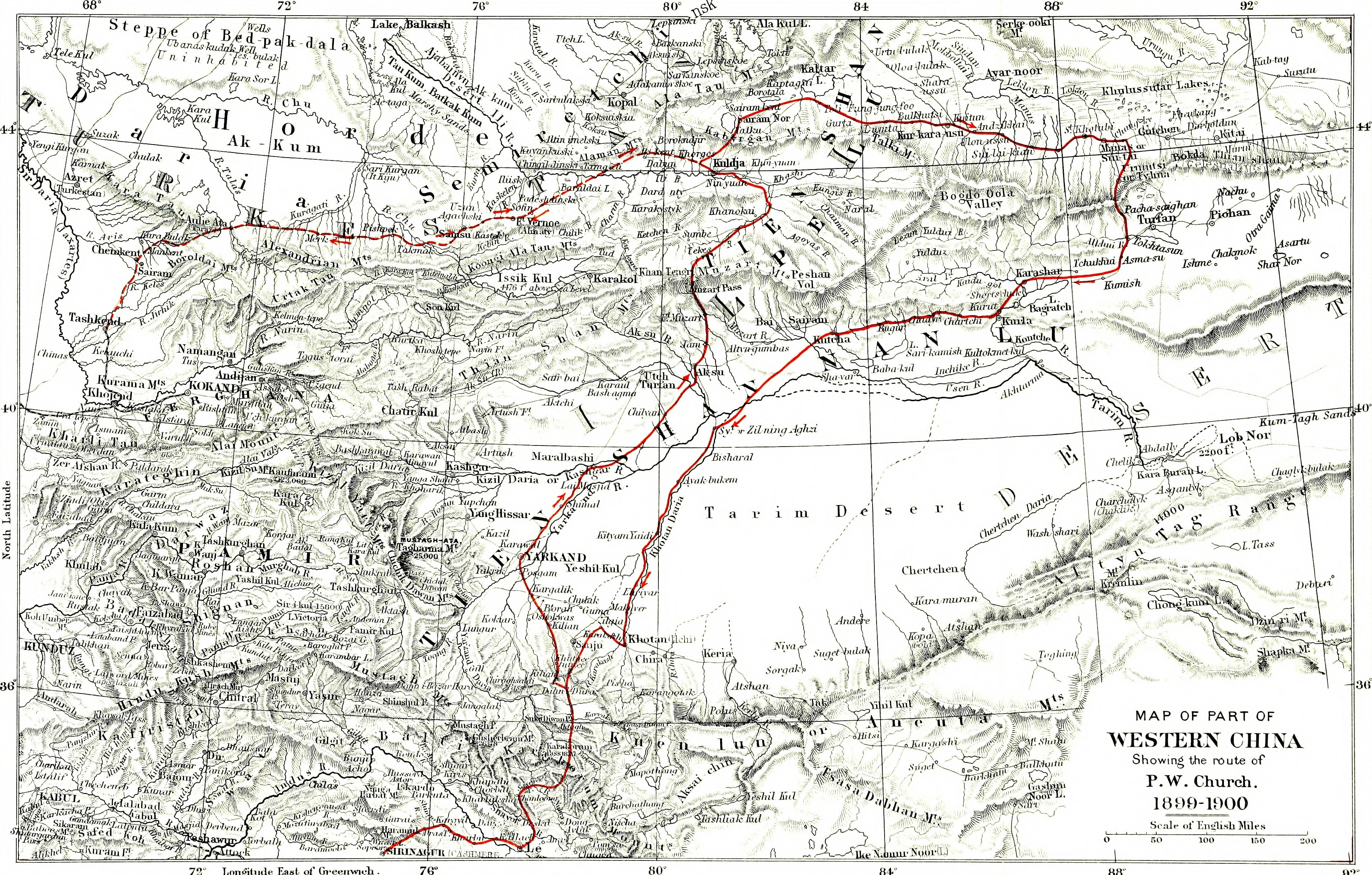
A 1901 map showing the areas around Chinese Turkestan.

Chinese Turkestan or Chinese Turkistan, is a geographical term or historical region corresponding to the region of the Tarim Basin in Southern Xinjiang (south of the Tian Shan mountain range) or Xinjiang as a whole which was under the rule of the Qing dynasty of China. It is considered a part of the Chinese Tartary that covered the Inner Asian regions ruled by the Qing dynasty. The Europeans commonly used this term especially during the period of the Qing dynasty to denote the division of Turkestan into territories controlled by the Chinese and the Russians, with the latter controlling Russian Turkestan in the west.

== Etymology ==
Eastern Central Asia was historically referred to as the Western Regions under the control of the Han dynasty and Tang dynasty of China. Over the course of the history the Turkic people conquered the Persian-speaking people in the region and established several small principalities in Central Asia. They then ruled over the region (later fell under the overlordship of the Mongols including the Chagatai Khanate and the Dzungar Khanate) until they were subjugated by the Chinese Qing dynasty during the final phase of the Dzungar–Qing Wars in the 1750s. Thence the European name of Chinese Turkestan (or Chinese Turkistan), similar to the name Russian Turkestan which was controlled by the Russian Empire and Afghan Turkestan in northern Afghanistan.

== Usage ==
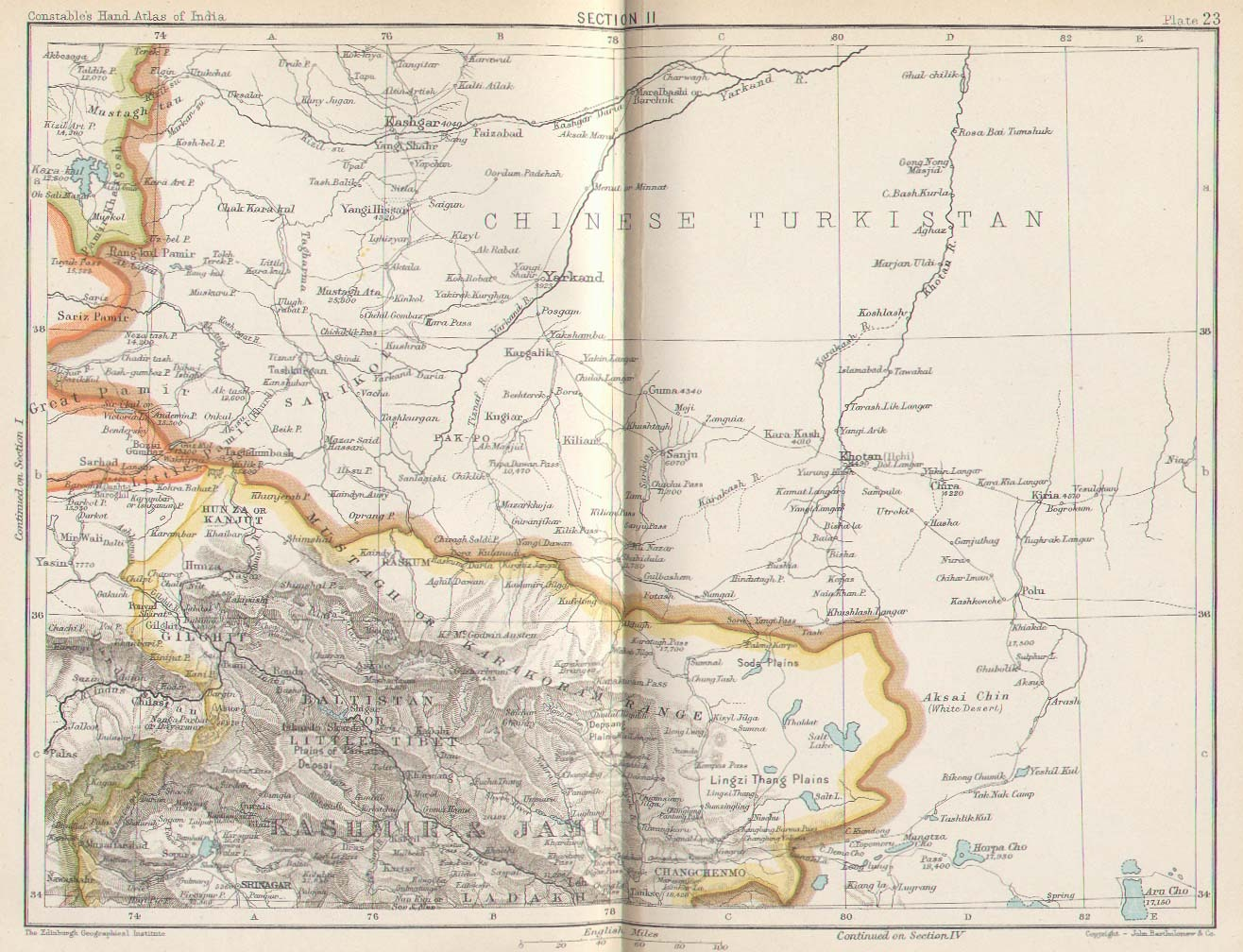
An 1893 map including part of Chinese Turkestan

The term "Chinese Turkestan" or "Chinese Turkistan" was commonly used by Europeans during the period of the Qing dynasty to specifically refer to the region (as a part of Chinese Tartary that was ruled by Qing China), while the Chinese often called this region Tian Shan Nan Lu (Chinese: 天山南路), meaning the area in Xinjiang south of the Tian Shan Mountains. The term "Chinese Turkestan" (or "Chinese Turkistan") can refer to Xinjiang as a whole in some sources; it was also sometimes used by Qing officials in English-language writings, such as in Chinese diplomat Zeng Jize's 1887 profile, "China: the Sleep, and the Awakening", originally published in the Asiatic Quarterly Review which was widely noticed in the West. The term gradually lost popularity in the 20th century worldwide after the fall of the Qing dynasty, although it was still being used in various publications during the eras when the Republic of China and the People's Republic of China ruled the region. During the 20th century, Uyghur separatists and their supporters used East Turkestan as an appellation for the whole of Xinjiang (Dzungaria and Southern Xinjiang) or for a future independent state in present-day Xinjiang Uyghur Autonomous Region, whereas others typically use the name "Xinjiang" to refer to the autonomous region of China. As a result, the term "Chinese Turkestan" (or "Chinese Turkistan") has largely been replaced by other terms nowadays, although it retains a certain degree of relevance.

== See also ==
- Altishahr
- China proper
- Chinese Tartary
- Chinese Empire
- East Turkestan
- Protectorate General to Pacify the West
- Protectorate of the Western Regions
- Western Regions
- Xinjiang under Qing rule
