= Padmaja Naidu Himalayan Zoological Park =

Zoological park in Darjeeling

Padmaji Naidu Himalayan Zoological Park

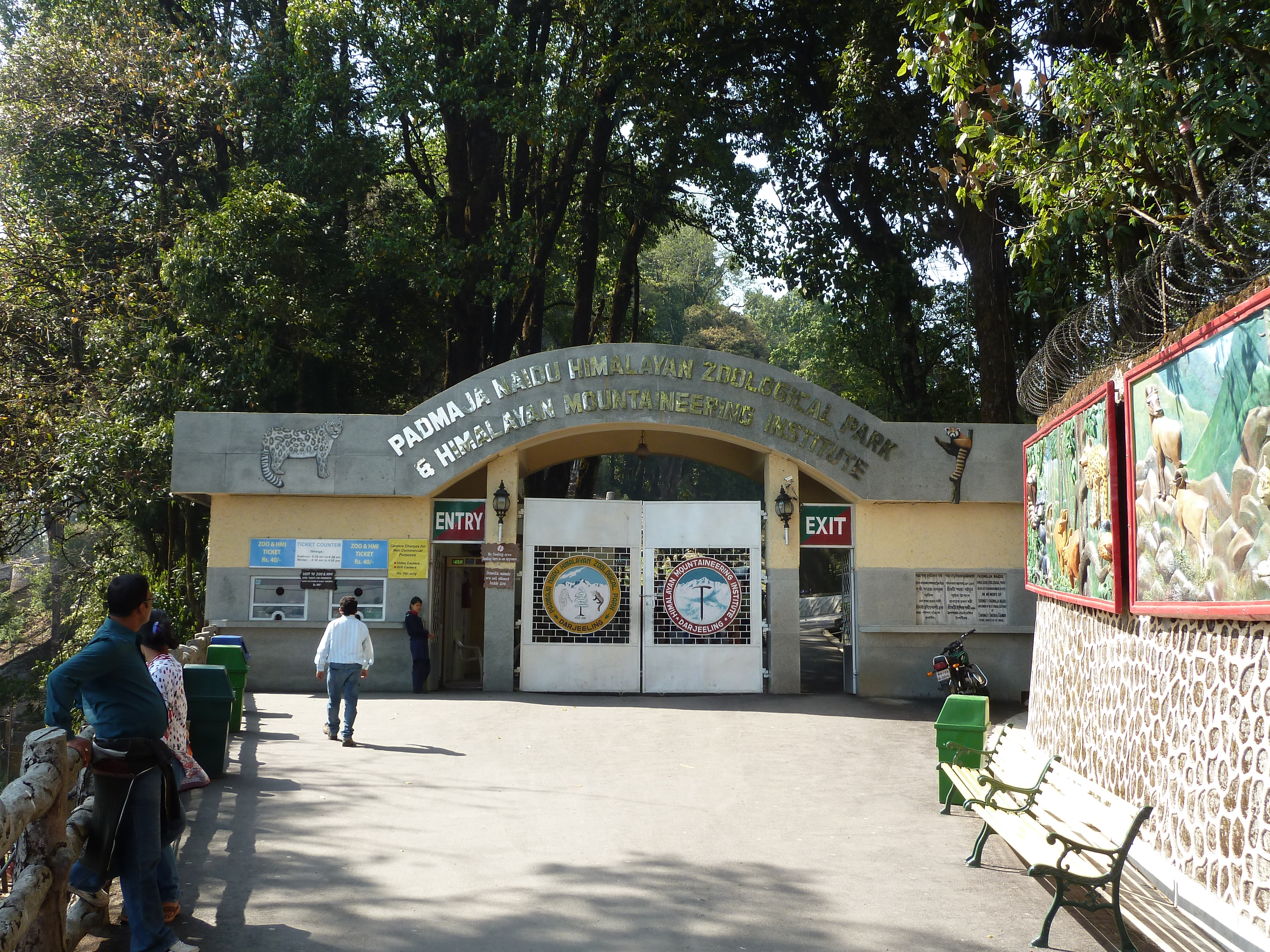
- Zoo entrance
- Interactive map of Padmaji Naidu Himalayan Zoological Park
- 27.0586099°N 88.254405°E
- Date opened: 26 July 1957
- Location: Darjeeling, West Bengal, India
- Land area: 67.56 acres (27.3 ha)
- No. of animals: 156 (2006)
- Annual visitors: 300,000 (2006)
- Memberships: CZA, WAZA
- Website: pnhzp.gov.in

Padmaja Naidu Himalayan Zoological Park (also called the Darjeeling Zoo) is a 67.56-acre (27.3 ha) zoo in the town of Darjeeling in the Indian state of West Bengal. The zoo was opened in 1958, and an average elevation of 7,000 feet (2,134 m), is the largest high altitude zoo in India. It specializes in breeding animals adapted to alpine conditions, and has successful captive breeding programs for the snow leopard, the endangered Himalayan wolf and the red panda. The zoo attracts about 300,000 visitors every year. The park is named after Padmaja Naidu (1900–1975) who served as the 4th Governor of West Bengal. The zoo serves as the central hub for Central Zoo Authority of India's red panda program and is a member of the World Association of Zoos and Aquariums.

== History ==
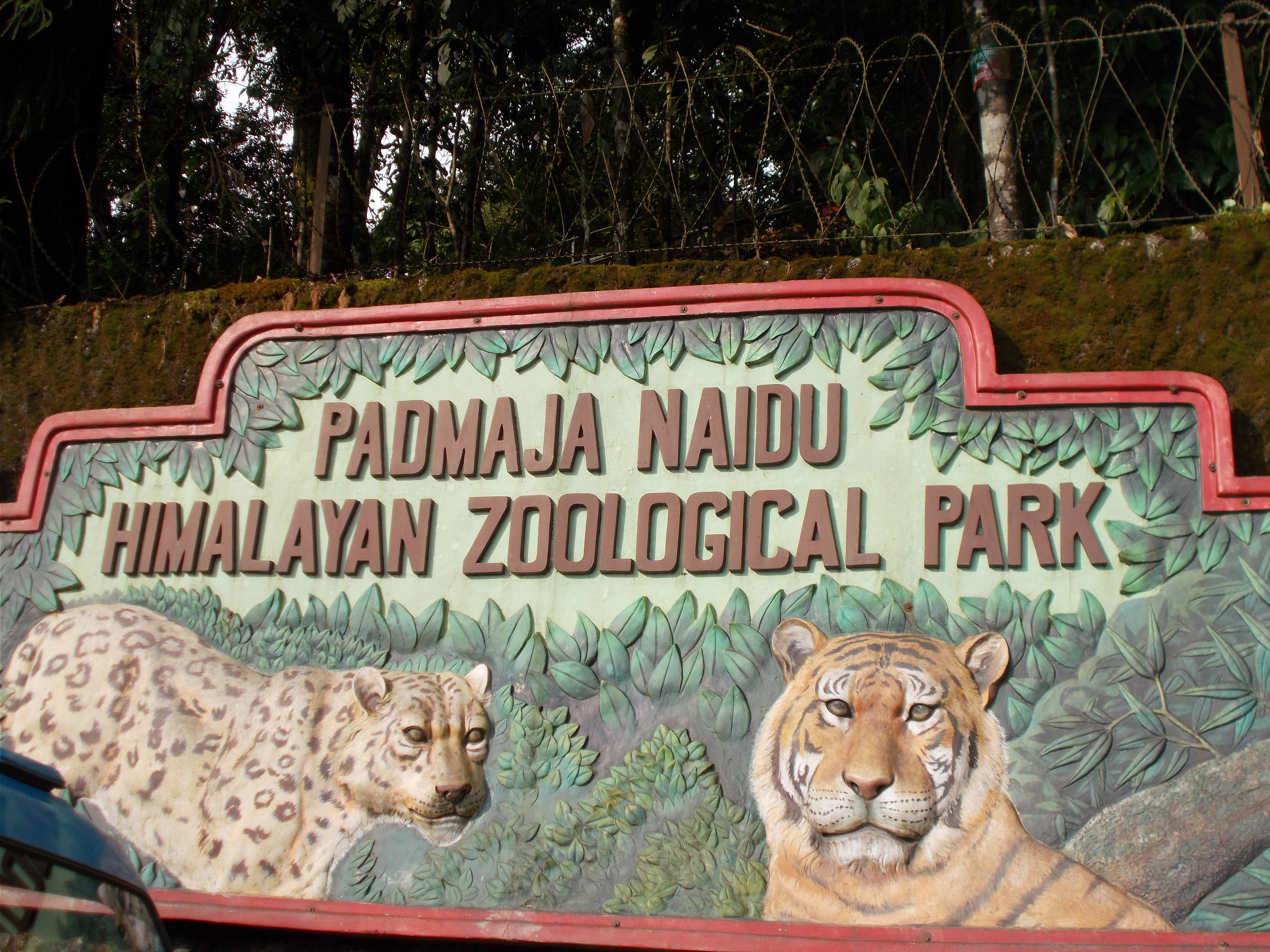
Padmaja Naidu Himalayan Zoological Park in Darjeeling

A zoo was established on 14 August 1958 in the Birch Hill neighbourhood of Darjeeling under the Department of Education of the Government of West Bengal with a goal to study and preserve Himalayan fauna. Its first Director and founder was Dilip Kumar Dey. Mr. Dey, who belonged to the Indian Forest Service was on deputation to the Department of Education for the express purpose of establishing a high-altitude zoological park specializing mainly in Himalayan flora and fauna. The park's prized possessions were a pair of Siberian (Ussuri) tigers presented to the Government of India by Soviet Premier Nikita Khrushchev in 1960. Over the years famous names in the world of Conservation have been attracted to and have visited the HZP. The zoo now contains endangered animals like snow leopards, red pandas, gorals (mountain goat), Siberian tigers and a variety of endangered birds. However, there has been concern regarding the fact that the Himalayan animals may face a threat due to rising temperatures in the hilly area.

In January 1972, the park became a registered society, with an agreement that maintenance costs would be shared by the central and state governments. In May 1993, the park was transferred to the West Bengal Department of Forests. The park was renamed in 1975 when Indira Gandhi, the Prime Minister of India, visited the park and dedicated it to the memory of Padmaja Naidu.

== Conservation ==
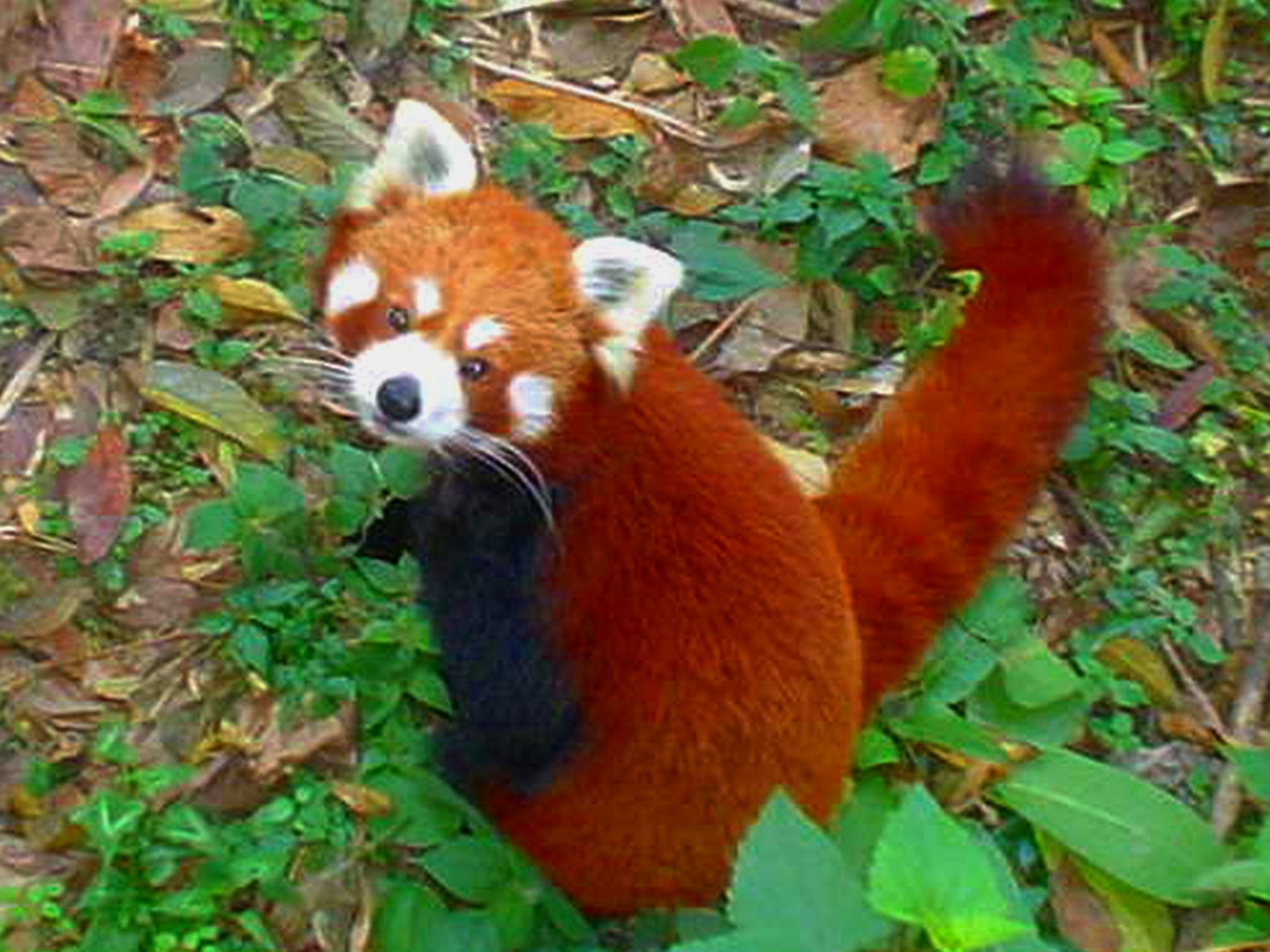
Red panda in the zoo

The zoo includes an off-display breeding center for snow leopards and red pandas. Captive breeding of snow leopards was started in 1983, with leopards which were brought to the zoo from Zurich, the United States, and Leh-Ladakh. The red panda program was started in 1994 with individuals from the Cologne Zoo, the Madrid Zoo, Belgium, and the Rotterdam Zoo. In addition to these species, the zoo is breeding the Himalayan tahr, blue sheep, Himalayan monal, grey peacock pheasant, Himalayan salamander, blood pheasant and satyr tragopan. The zoo is famous for its conservation breeding programmes of the red panda, Himalayan salamander, Tibetan wolf (Himalayan Wolf), and snow leopard.

== Gallery ==
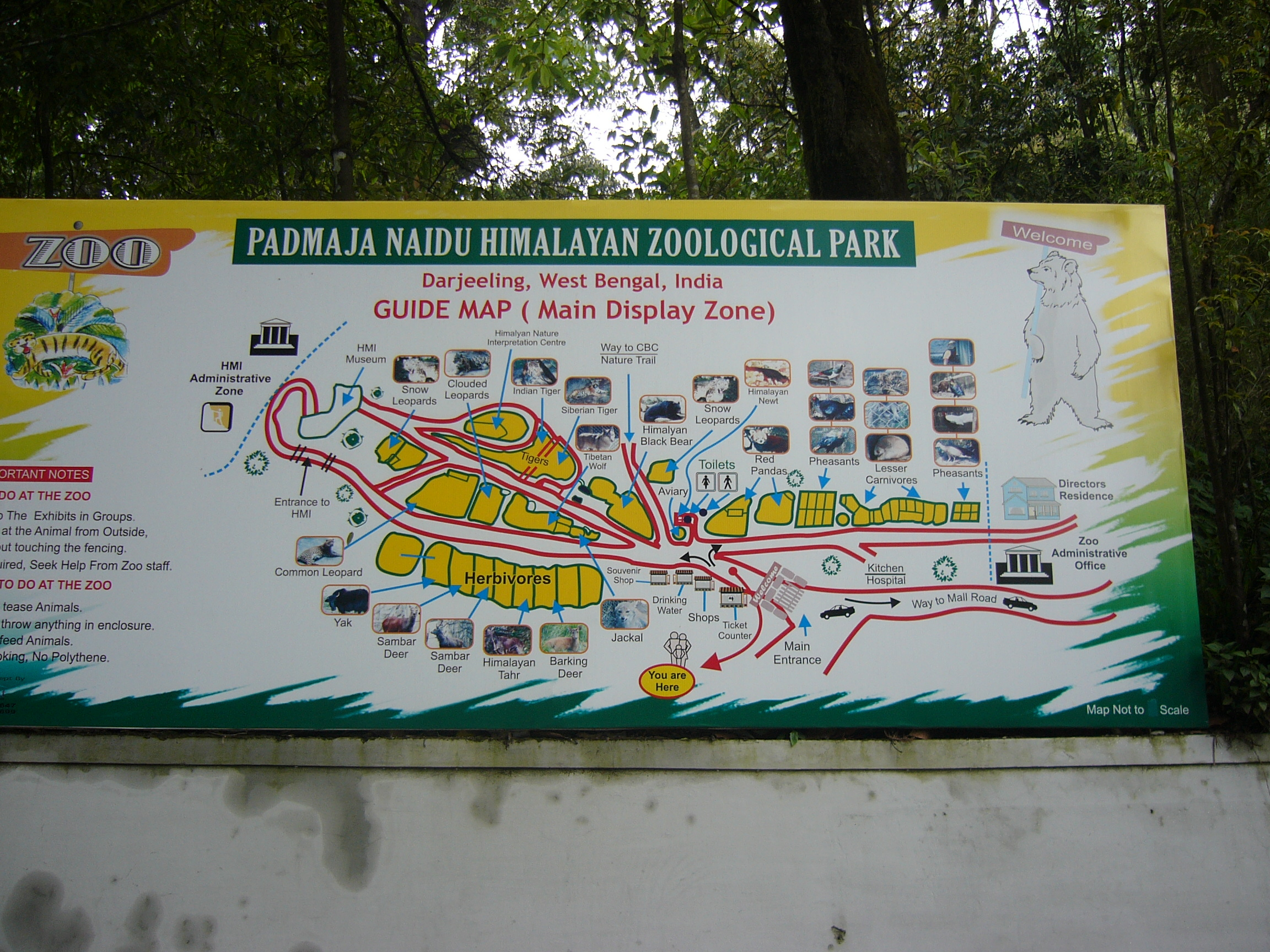
Entrance

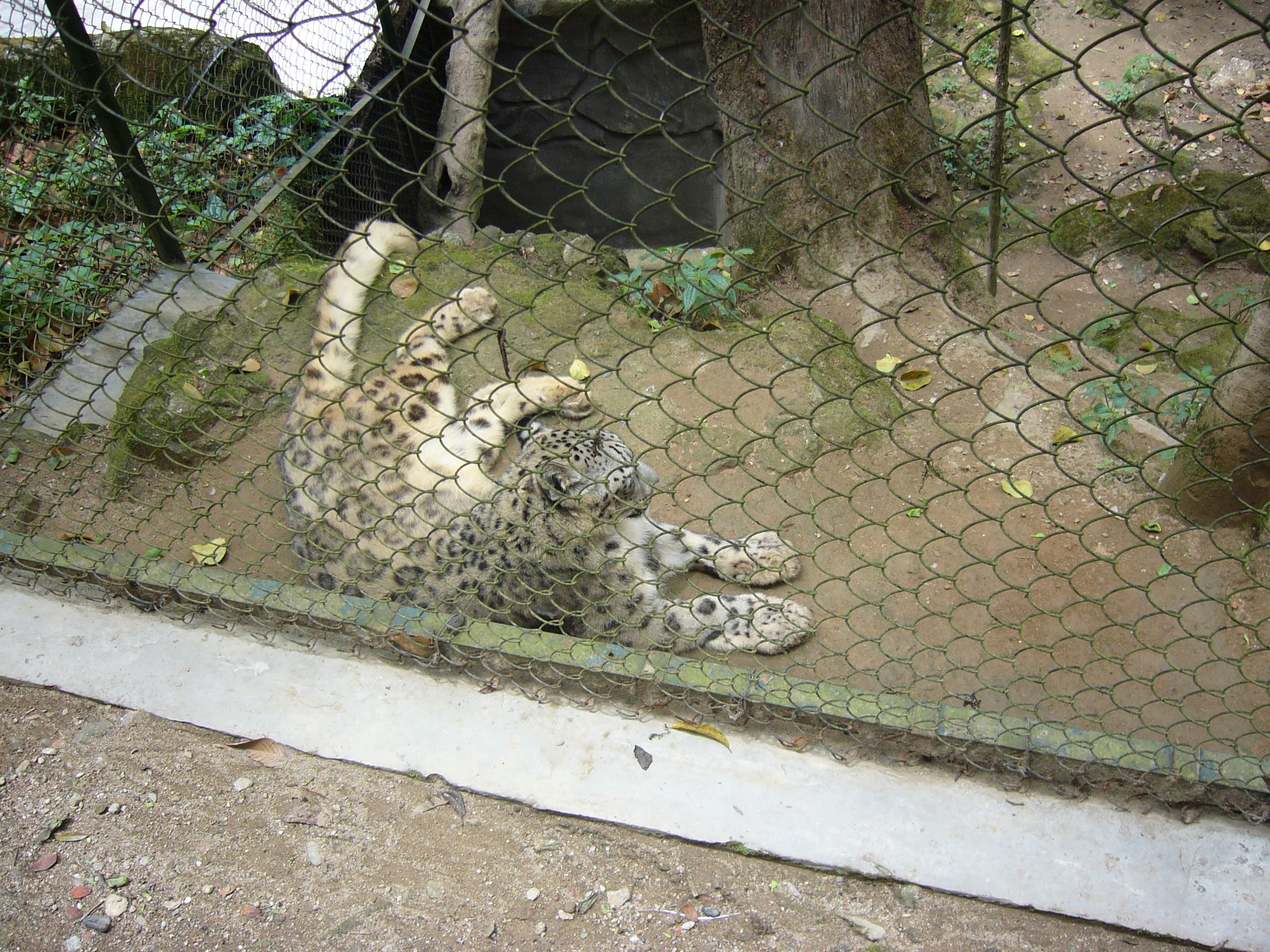
Snow leopard

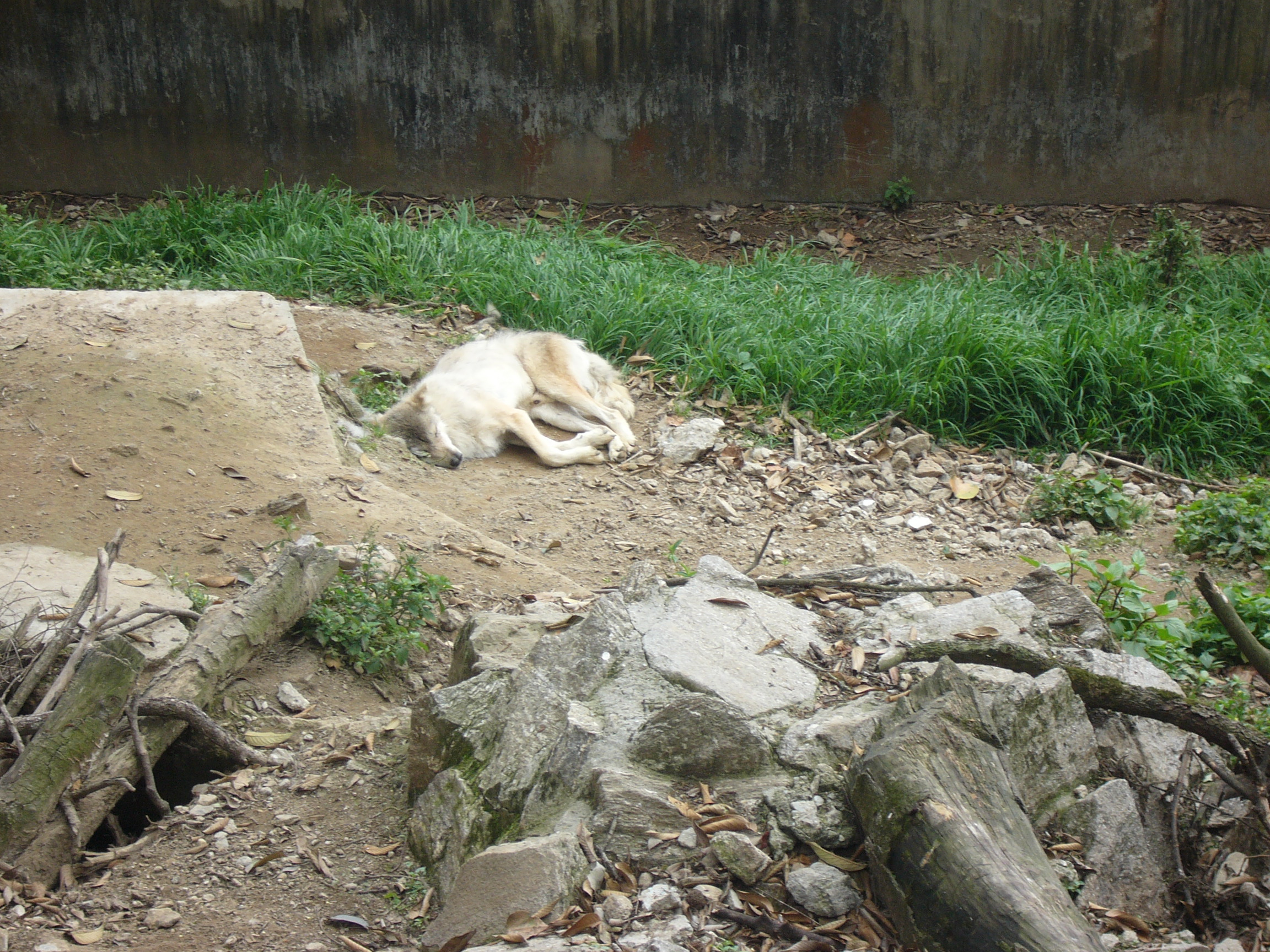
Tibetan wolf

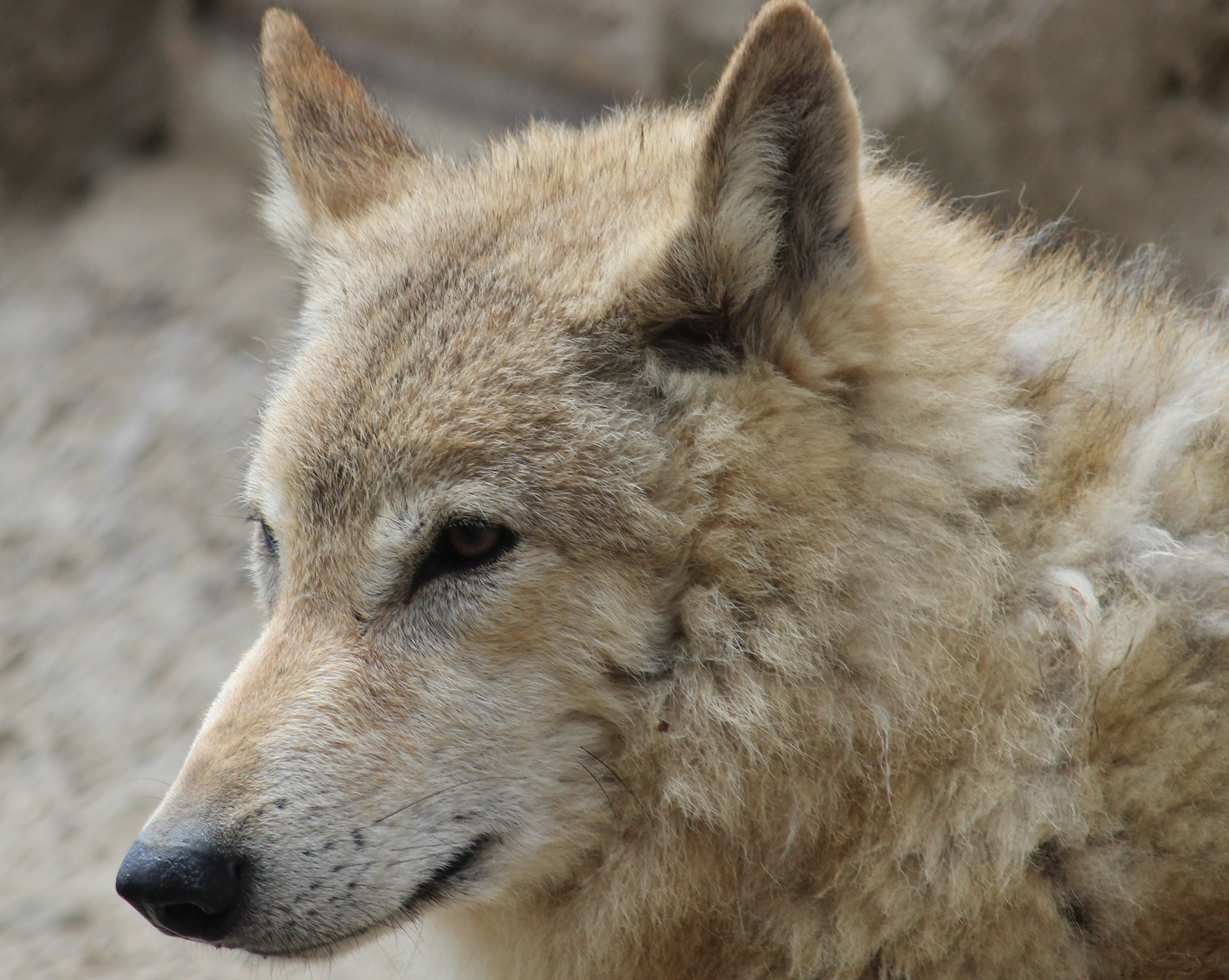
Tibetan wolf

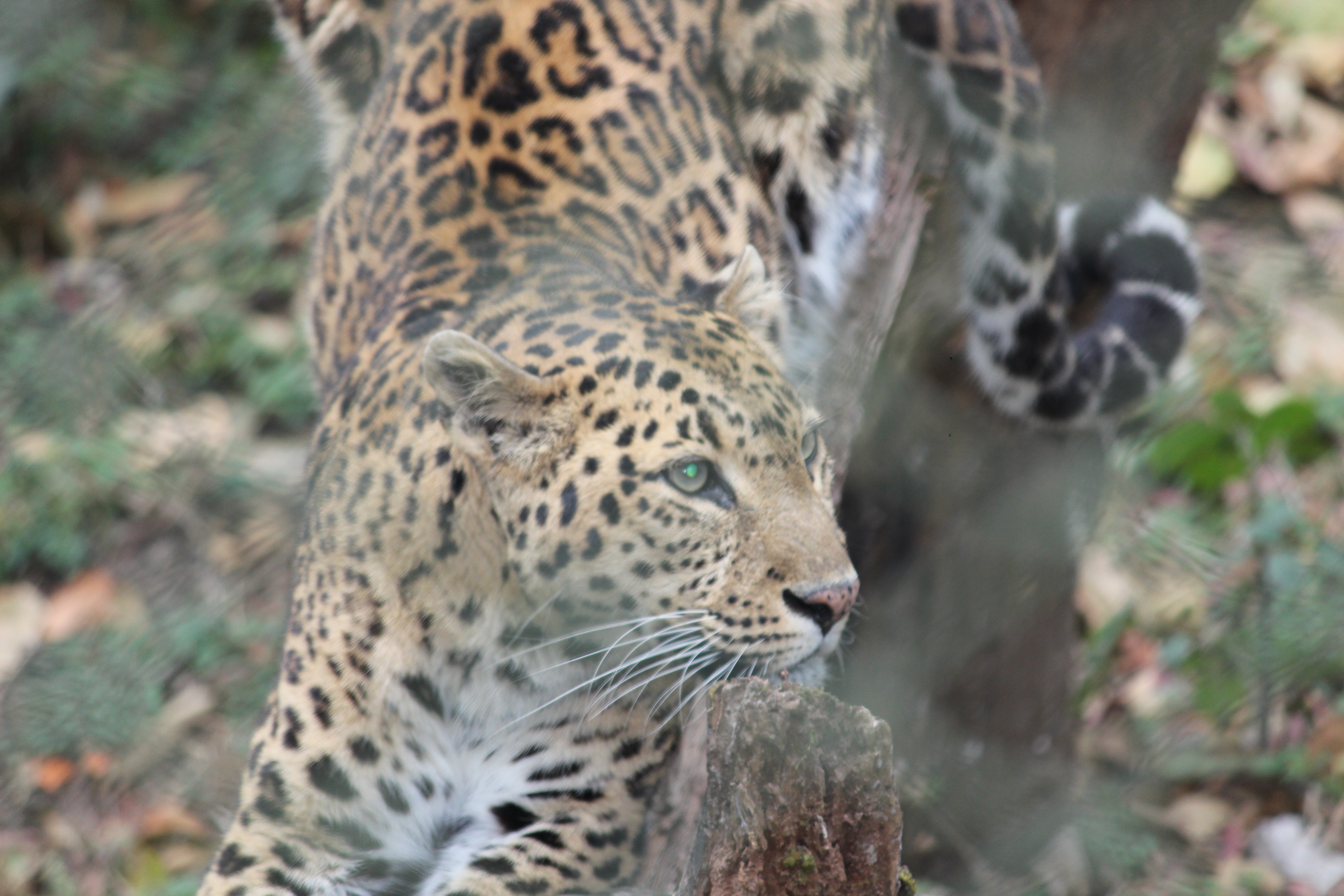
Himalayan leopard

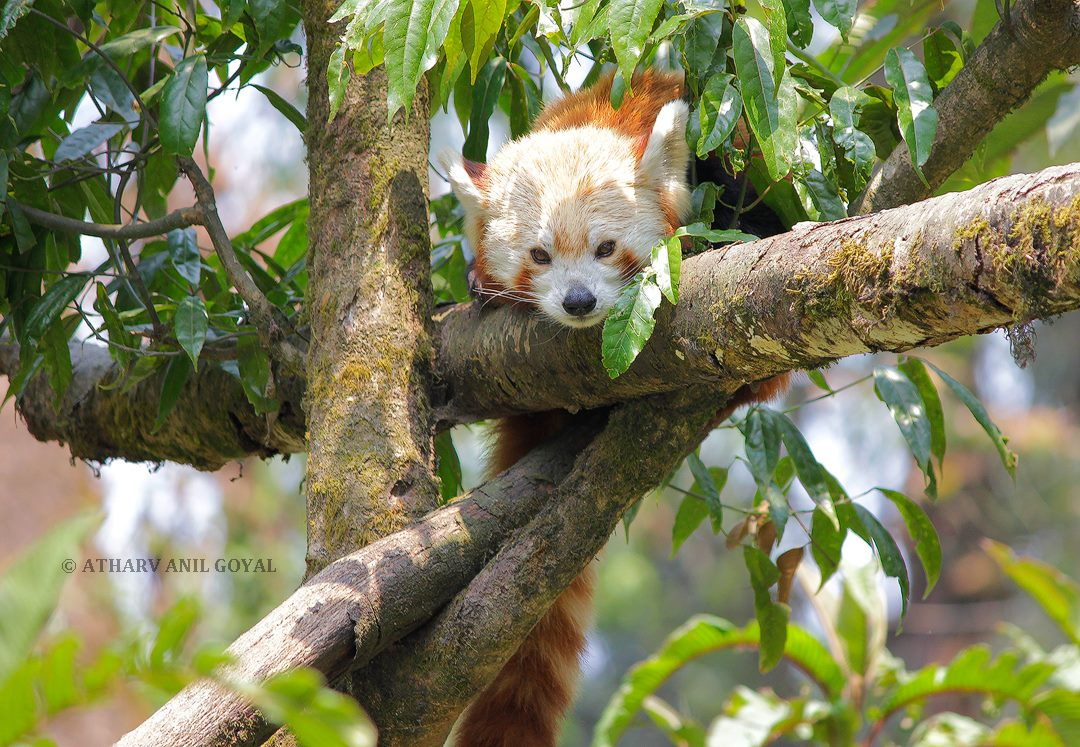
Red panda

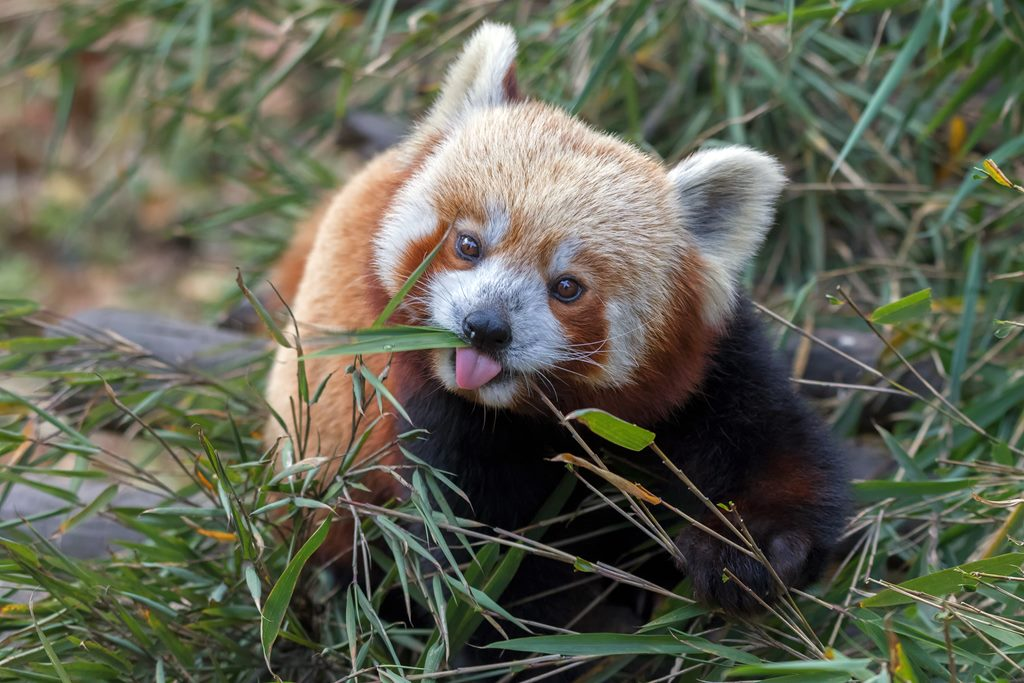
Red Panda feeding on bamboo shoots

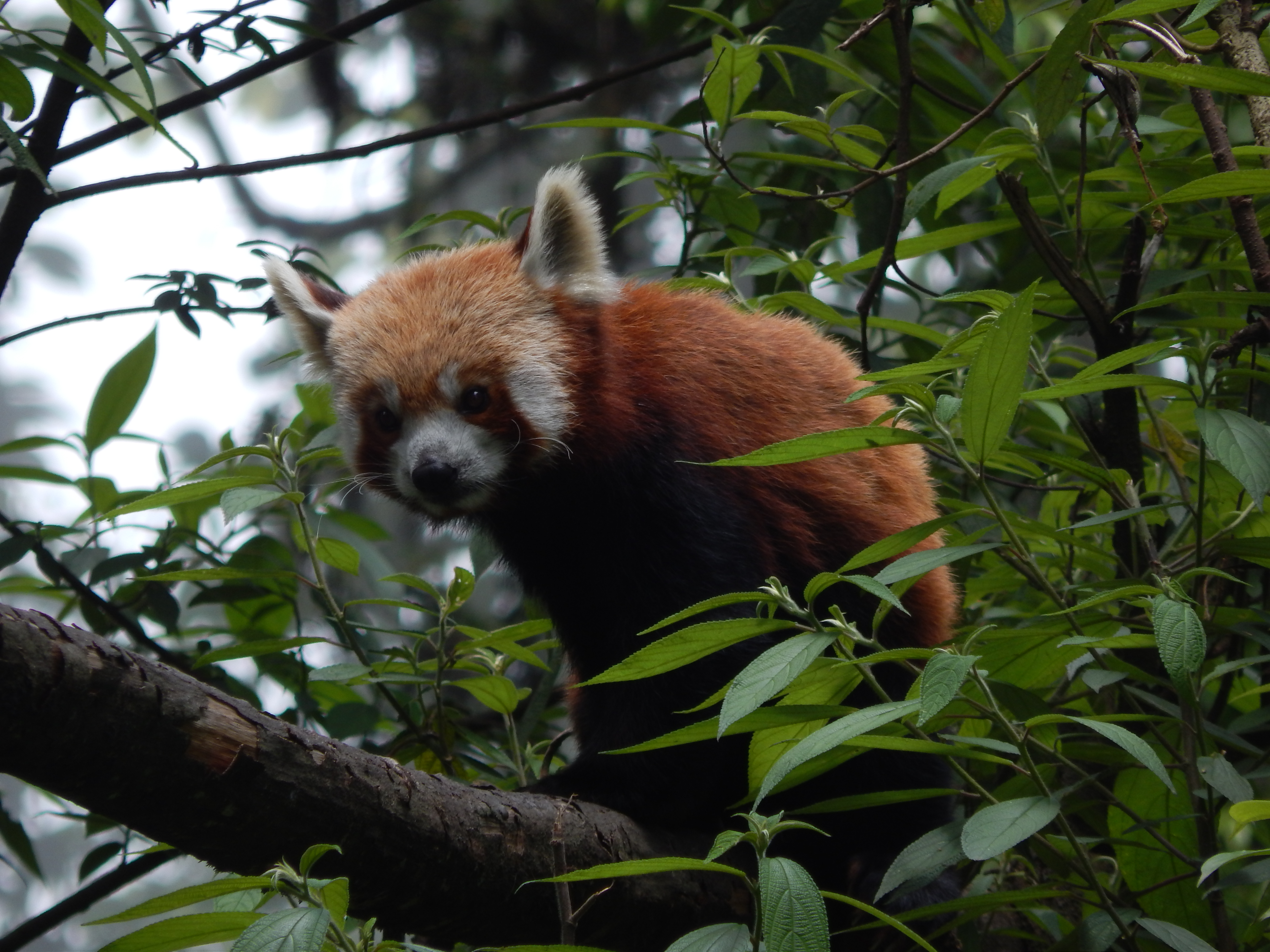
A red panda, one of the main attractions of the zoo
