= Chinese Tartary =

Archaic geographical term

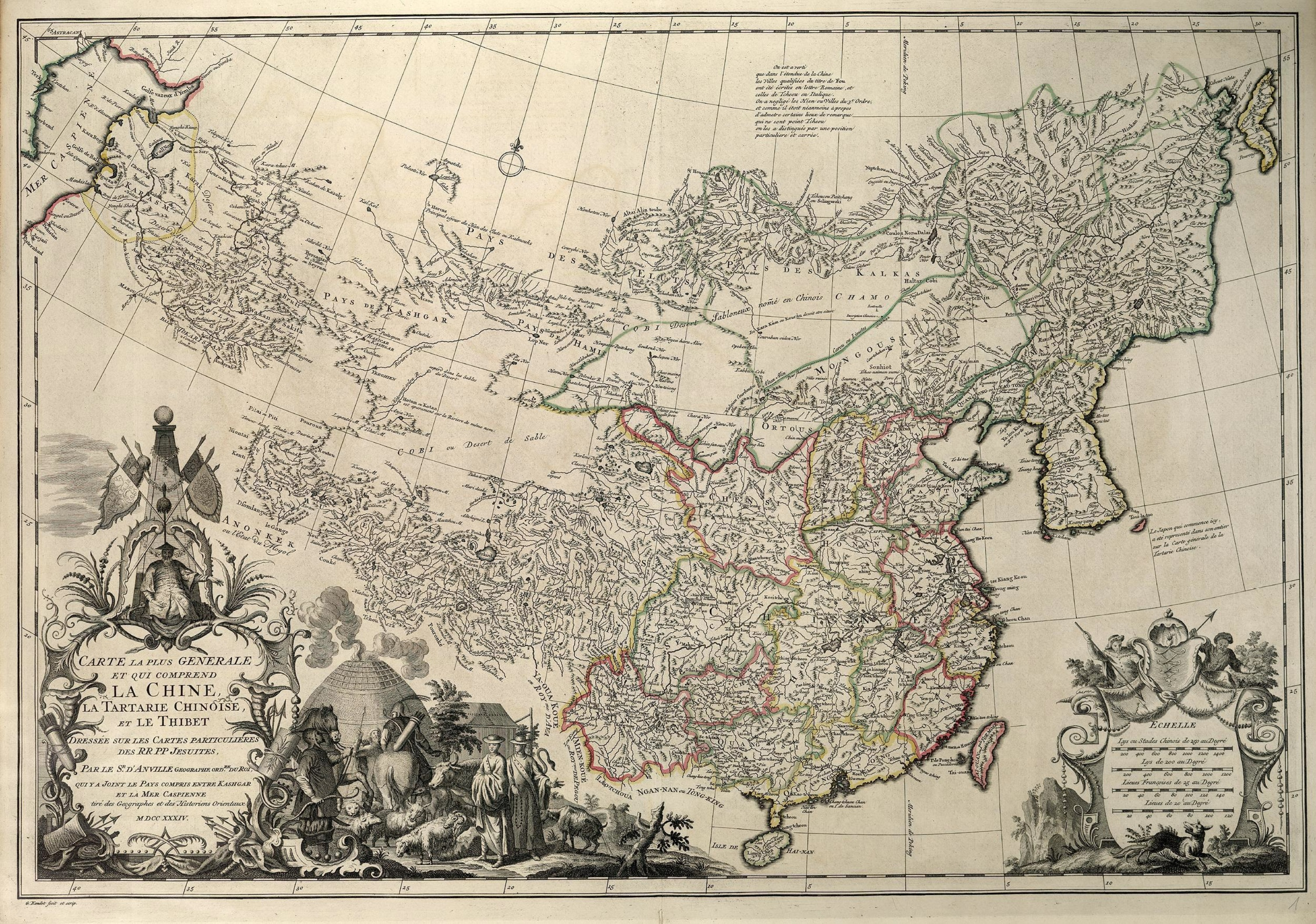
D'Anville's map of China proper and Chinese Tartary, created in 1734.

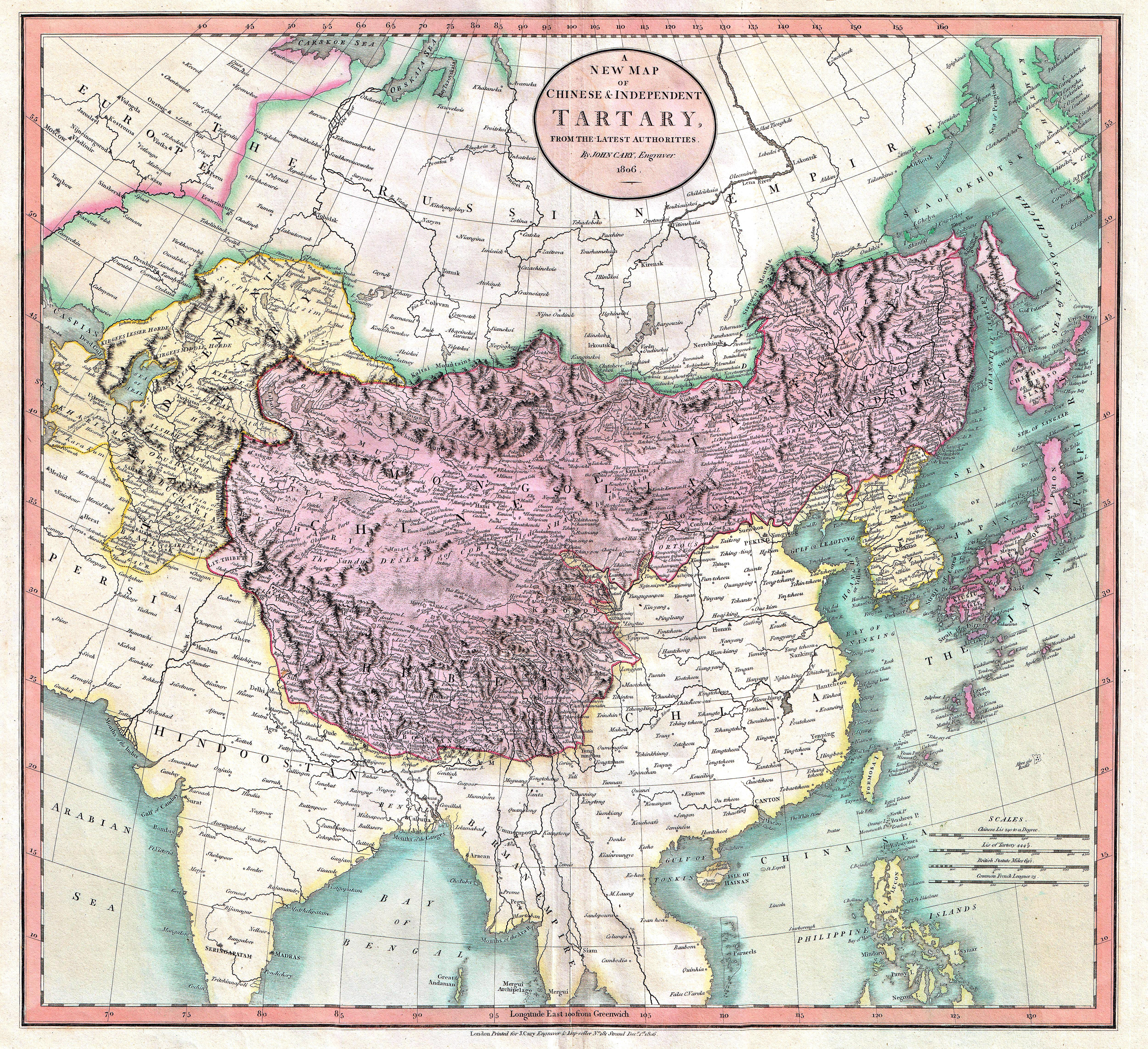
Map of independent Tartary (in yellow) and Chinese Tartary (in pink), in 1806.

Chinese Tartary (simplified Chinese: 中国鞑靼利亚; traditional Chinese: 中國韃靼利亞; pinyin: Zhōngguó Dádálìyà or simplified Chinese: 中属鞑靼利亚; traditional Chinese: 中屬韃靼利亞; pinyin: Zhōng shǔ Dádálìyà) is an archaic geographical term referring to the regions of Manchuria, Mongolia, Xinjiang (also referred to as Chinese Turkestan), and Tibet under the rule of the Qing dynasty of China. The geographical extent of Chinese Tartary largely corresponds with that of the "Feudatory Regions" (Chinese: 藩部; pinyin: fānbù), as defined by the Qing court. The term "Tartar" was used by Europeans to refer to ethnicities living in northern, northeastern, and western China, including the Mongols, Manchus, Tibetans, and Central Asians. The regions are now more commonly referred to by scholars as Inner Asia.

== History of the term ==
Early European writers used the term "Tartar" indiscriminately for all the peoples of Northern Eurasia and referred to their lands as "Tartary". By the 17th century, however, largely under the influence of Catholic missionary writings, the word "Tartar" came to refer to the Manchus, and the land they ruled as "Tartary", referring to Manchuria and adjacent parts of Inner Asia ruled by the Qing dynasty. The term "Chinese Tartary" was used as early as 1734 on a map created by the French geographer and cartographer Jean Baptiste Bourguignon d'Anville (1697–1782), who published the map in the Nouvel atlas de la Chine, de la Tartarie Chinoise et du Thibet (New atlas of China, Chinese Tartary, and Tibet) in 1738.

D'Anville's map was based on work ordered by the Emperor of Qing China and conducted by the Chinese under the supervision of Jesuits. Also published in 1738 was A description of the empire of China and Chinese-Tartary together with the kingdoms of Korea, and Tibet by Jean-Baptiste Du Halde. In 1741, he went on to write The General History of China Containing a Geographical, Historical, Chronological, Political and Physical Description of the Empire of China, Chinese-Tartary, Corea and Thibet.

== Modern areas ==
The areas described by this work as falling within Chinese Tartary included:

- Xinjiang (Chinese Turkestan)
- Mongolia (Inner Mongolia and Outer Mongolia)
- Manchuria (Northeast China and Outer Manchuria)
- Qinghai

In 1832, the geographical boundaries of Chinese Tartary were defined in A Geographical Dictionary Or Universal Gazetteer.

By 1867, the area of Chinese Tartary was described as the three vast areas covering Manchuria, Mongolia, and Ili (Xinjiang).

== See also ==
- Tartary
- Chinese Empire
- Qing dynasty in Inner Asia
- China proper
