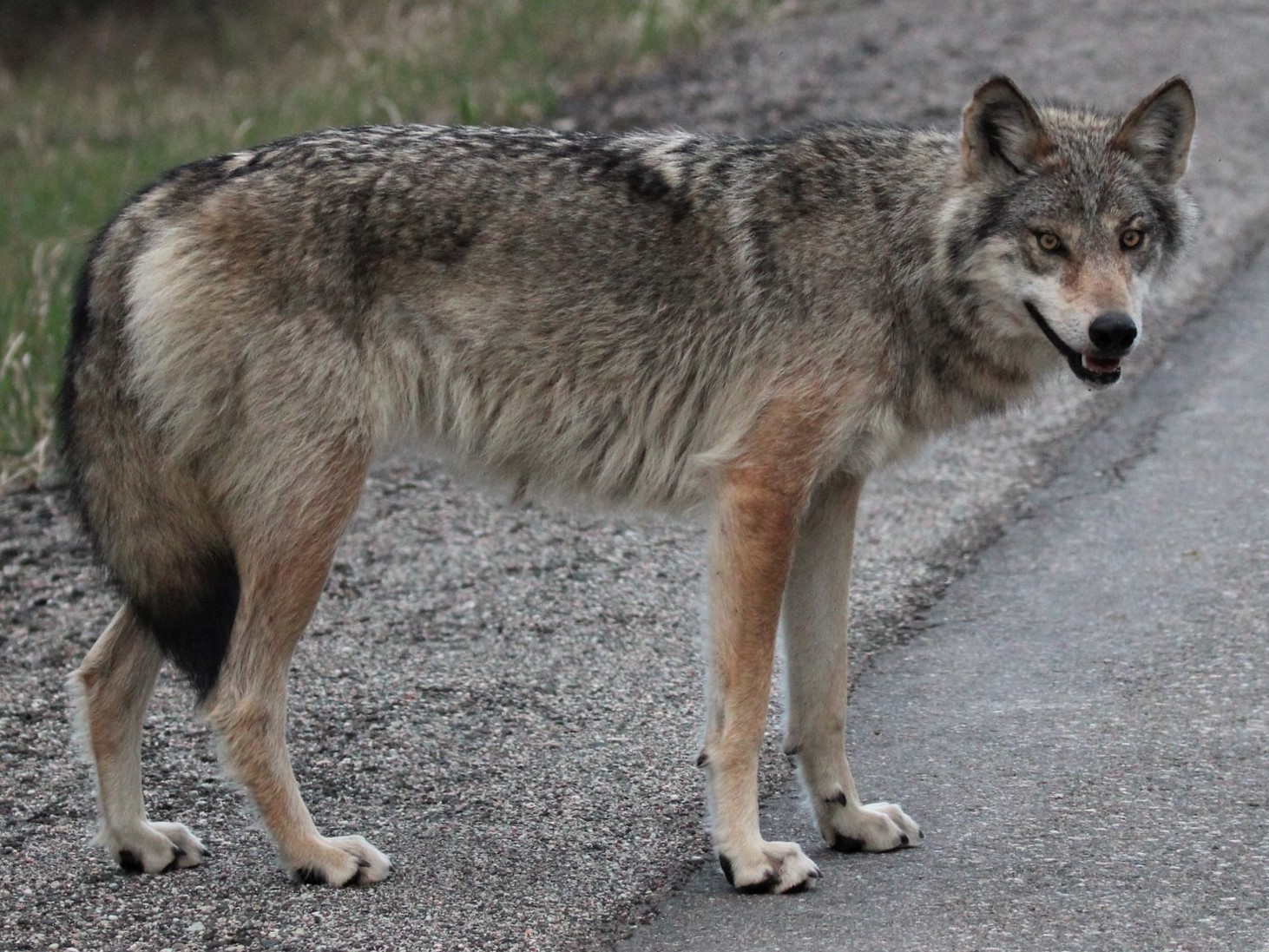

Scientific classification
- Kingdom: Animalia
- Phylum: Chordata
- Class: Mammalia
- Order: Carnivora
- Family: Canidae
- Subtribe: Canina
- Genus: Canis
- Species: C. lupus nubilus × C. lycaon

= Great Lakes-boreal wolf =

Canine hybrid native to the Great Lakes region

The Great Lakes-boreal wolf is a North American hybrid canine population with Great Plains wolf and eastern wolf ancestry. By the 1960s, wolves of this population were the only wolves which had survived in the lower 48 states in the United States.

The Great Lakes-boreal wolf inhabits the temperate broadleaf and mixed forests of the Great Lakes region. This animal largely preys on large ungulates such as moose and white-tailed deer in winter, though they also prey on beavers in spring and summer.

== Taxonomy ==
This canine has been referred as the Minnesota wolf, Great Lakes wolf, and Great Lakes-boreal wolf. Edward Alphonso Goldman noted the presence of the Great Lakes-boreal wolf and wrote that wolf specimens from Minnesota and Michigan had characteristics intermediate between the Great Plains wolf and the eastern wolf, though he referred these as eastern wolves.

A 2011 study showed that wolves in the Great Lakes before 1950 showed more affinity to eastern wolves based on skull remains. However, during the early and mid-1970s, wolf skulls shifted to being more similar to Great Plains wolf, following their eastward migrations. Rostral ratios examined which date from 1969 to 1999 showed that Great Lakes wolves were the result of hybridization between Great Plains and eastern wolves.

=== Lineage ===
Gray wolves (Canis lupus) migrated from Eurasia into North America 70,000–23,000 years ago and gave rise to at least two morphologically and genetically distinct groups. One group is represented by the extinct Beringian wolf and the other by the modern populations. One author proposes that eastern wolves form a distinct clade basal to the coyote clade and Great Plains wolves are the second wolves to cross the Bering land bridge, after Mexican wolves. The Great Lakes wolf likely originated 8,000 BP after ice sheets melted in the Great Lakes region.

=== Ancestry ===
In 2021, an mDNA analysis of modern and extinct North American wolf-like canines indicates that the extinct Late Pleistocene Beringian wolf was the ancestor of the southern wolf clade, which includes the Great Plains wolf and Mexican wolf. The modern coyote appeared around 10,000 years ago. The most genetically basal coyote mDNA clade pre-dates the Last Glacial Maximum and is a haplotype that can only be found in the eastern wolf. This implies that the large, wolf-like Pleistocene coyote was the ancestor of the eastern wolf. Further, another ancient haplotype detected in the Eastern wolf can be found only in the Mexican wolf. The authors propose that Pleistocene coyote and Beringian wolf admixture led to the eastern wolf long before the arrival of the modern coyote and the modern wolf.

== Diet ==
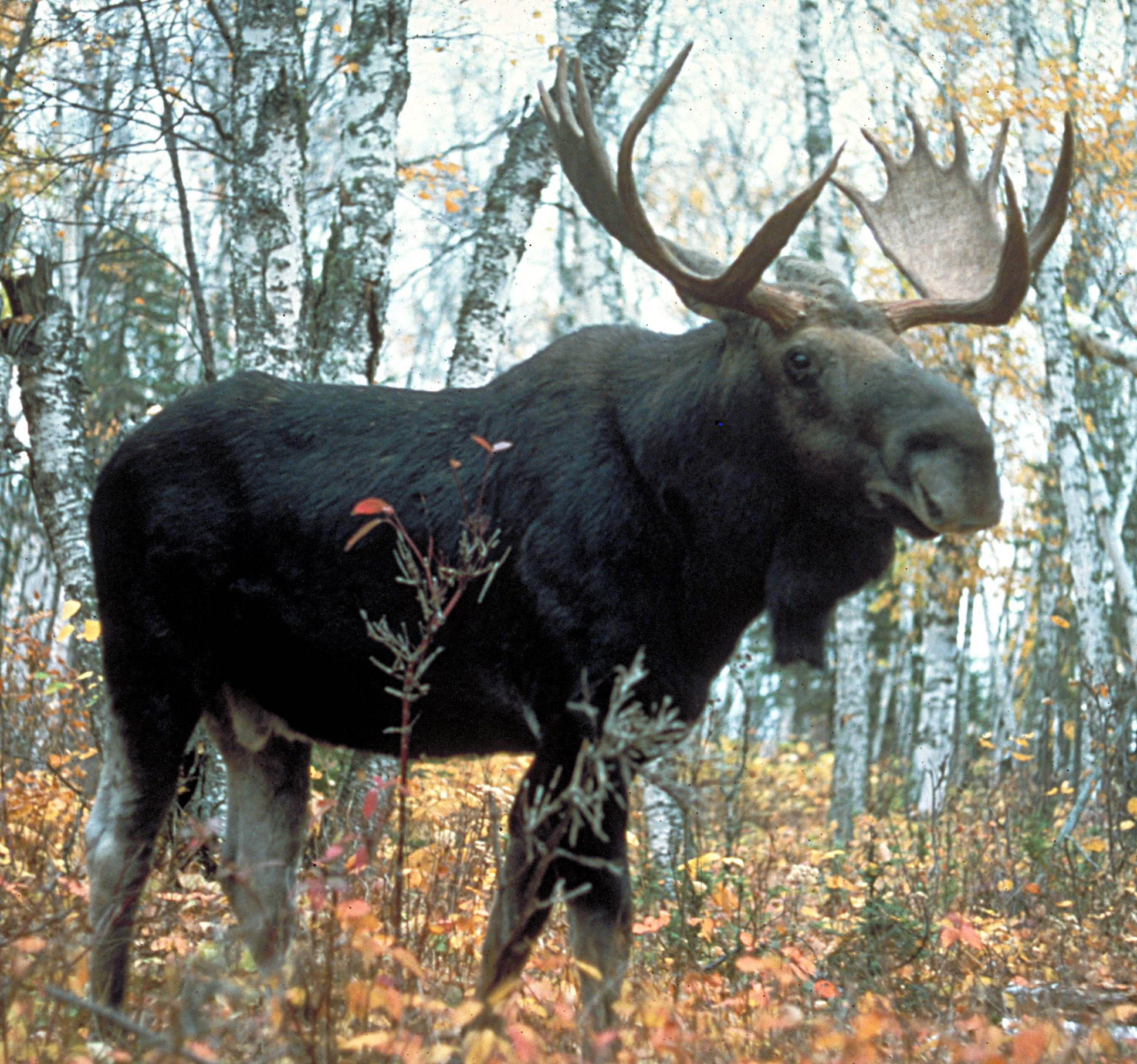
Large ungulates such as moose (pictured) make up most of the Great Lakes-boreal wolf's winter diet.

As with all other wolves, Great Lakes-boreal wolves are opportunistic predators and mainly prey on large ungulates. In the winter, Great Lakes-boreal wolves are known to prey on moose and northern white-tailed deer (the latter of which is their primary prey). During spring and fall, Great Lakes-boreal wolves prey on North American beavers, mice, and other small rodents.

A 2018 study tracking down a northeastern Minnesota wolf pack saw that 58% of their diet was composed of non-ungulates during the summer. These wolves typically ate deer until mid-July, after which berries such as those from the genera Vaccinium and Rubus made up around 56–83% of their diet biomass until mid-August. After mid-August, deer and snowshoe hare became the wolves' primary prey, and in October, the wolves diet diversity doubled after the wolves began devouring different food types. In fall, the wolves consumed American black bear carcasses, typically from fatally wounded bears.

== Conservation ==
Grey wolves were considered extirpated from the conterminous United States in the 1940s, but some survived in the remote northeastern corner of Minnesota. After they were listed as an endangered species, they naturally expanded into many of the habitats in the Midwestern states of Minnesota, Michigan, and Wisconsin they had previously occupied. These three states are estimated to have a stable population of 4,400 wolves. The western Great Lakes region they inhabit includes the forested areas of these states, along with the Canadian provinces of Manitoba and Ontario. In 1978, wolves were protected under the federal Endangered Species Act as it was determined that they were in danger of going extinct and needed protection to aid their recovery. Management under the Act allowed the remaining wolves in Minnesota to flourish and repopulate northern Wisconsin and the Upper Peninsula of Michigan. Wolves were removed from federal protection in January 2021 with management authority remaining with state and tribal authorities. Management plans guide each state's decisions about wolf regulations for hunting, trapping, and culling along with population monitoring, and livestock damage control. In February 2022, a judge ordered federal protections for gray wolves to be restored under the Federal Endangered Species Act which returned management authority to the U.S. Fish and Wildlife Service.

== See also ==
- Wolves and moose on Isle Royale
- Coywolf
- Eastern coyote
