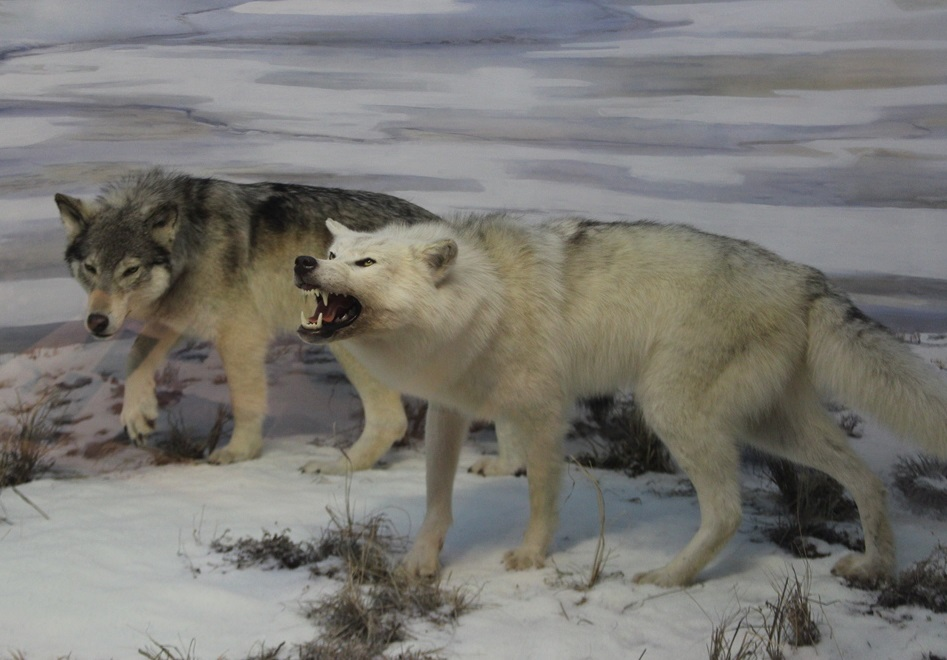
- Two models of Beringian wolves created by paleo-artists working at the Yukon Beringia Interpretive Centre

Scientific classification
- Kingdom: Animalia
- Phylum: Chordata
- Class: Mammalia
- Order: Carnivora
- Family: Canidae
- Genus: Canis
- Species: C. lupus
- Population: †Beringian wolf

= Beringian wolf =

Beringian wolf Temporal range: Late Pleistocene – early Holocene (50,000–8,400 years ago)

Extinct North American wolf

Animated map showing Beringia sea levels measured in meters from 21,000 years ago to present. Beringia once spanned the Chukchi Sea and the Bering Sea, joining Eurasia to North America.

The Beringian wolf is an extinct population of wolf (Canis lupus) that lived during the Ice Age. It inhabited what is now modern-day Alaska, Yukon, and northern British Columbia. Some of these wolves survived well into the Holocene. The Beringian wolf is an ecomorph of the gray wolf and has been comprehensively studied using a range of scientific techniques, yielding new information on their prey species and feeding behaviors. It has been determined that these wolves are morphologically distinct from modern North American wolves and genetically basal to most modern and extinct wolves. The Beringian wolf has not been assigned a subspecies classification and its relationship with the extinct European cave wolf (Canis lupus spelaeus) is not clear.

The Beringian wolf was similar in size to the modern Alaskan Interior wolf (Canis lupus pambasileus) and other Late Pleistocene gray wolves but more robust and with stronger jaws and teeth, a broader palate, and larger carnassial teeth relative to its skull size. In comparison with the Beringian wolf, the more southerly occurring dire wolf (Aenocyon dirus) was the same size but heavier and with a more robust skull and dentition. The unique adaptation of the skull and dentition of the Beringian wolf allowed it to produce relatively large bite forces, grapple with large struggling prey, and therefore made predation and scavenging on Pleistocene megafauna possible. The Beringian wolf preyed most often on horse and steppe bison, and also on caribou, mammoth, and woodland muskox.

At the close of the Ice Age, with the loss of cold and dry conditions and the extinction of much of its prey, the Beringian wolf became extinct. The extinction of its prey has been attributed to the impact of climate change, competition with other species, including humans, or a combination of both factors. Local genetic populations were replaced by others from within the same species or of the same genus. Of the North American wolves, only the ancestor of the modern North American gray wolf survived. The remains of ancient wolves with similar skulls and dentition have been found in western Beringia (northeastern Siberia). In 2016, a study showed that some of the wolves now living in remote corners of China and Mongolia share a common maternal ancestor with one 28,000-year-old eastern Beringian wolf specimen.

== Taxonomy ==
Starting in the 1930s, representatives of the American Museum of Natural History worked with the Alaska College and the Fairbanks Exploration Company to collect specimens uncovered by hydraulic gold dredging near Fairbanks, Alaska. Childs Frick was a research associate in paleontology with the American Museum who had been working in the Fairbanks region. In 1930, he published an article which contained a list of "extinct Pleistocene mammals of Alaska-Yukon". This list included one specimen of what he believed to be a new subspecies which he named Aenocyon dirus alaskensis – the Alaskan dire wolf. The American museum referred to these as a typical Pleistocene species in Fairbanks. However, no type specimen, description nor exact location was provided, and because dire wolves had not been found this far north this name was later proposed as nomen nudum (invalid) by the paleontologist Ronald M. Nowak. Between 1932 and 1953 twenty-eight wolf skulls were recovered from the Ester, Cripple, Engineer, and Little Eldorado creeks located north and west of Fairbanks. The skulls were thought to be 10,000 years old. The geologist and paleontologist Theodore Galusha, who helped amass the Frick collections of fossil mammals at the American Museum of Natural History, worked on the wolf skulls over a number of years and noted that, compared with modern wolves, they were "short-faced". The paleontologist Stanley John Olsen continued Galusha's work with the short-faced wolf skulls, and in 1985, based on their morphology, he classified them as Canis lupus (gray wolf).

Gray wolves were widely distributed across North America during both the Pleistocene and historic period. In 2007 Jennifer Leonard undertook a study based on the genetic, morphology, and stable isotope analyses of seventy-four Beringian wolf specimens from Alaska and the Yukon that revealed the genetic relationships, prey species, and feeding behavior of prehistoric wolves, and supported the classification of this wolf as C. lupus. The specimens were not assigned a subspecies classification by Leonard, who referred to these as "eastern Beringian wolves". A subspecies was possibly not assigned because the relationship between the Beringian wolf and the extinct European cave wolf (C. l. spelaeus) is not clear. Beringia was once an area of land that spanned the Chukchi Sea and the Bering Sea, joining Eurasia to North America. Eastern Beringia included what is today Alaska and the Yukon.

== Lineage ==
=== Basal wolf ===
DNA sequences can be mapped to reveal a phylogenetic tree that represents evolutionary relationships, with each branch point representing the divergence of two lineages from a common ancestor. On this tree the term basal is used to describe a lineage that forms a branch diverging nearest to the common ancestor. Wolf genetic sequencing has found the Beringian wolf to be basal to all other gray wolves except for the modern Indian gray wolf and Himalayan wolf.

As of 2020, the oldest known intact wolf remains belongs to a mummified pup dated 56,000 YBP that was recovered from the permafrost along a small tributary of Last Chance Creek near Dawson City, Yukon, Canada. A DNA analysis showed that it belonged to the Beringian wolf clade, that the most recent common ancestor of this clade dates to 86,700–67,500 YBP, and that this clade was basal to all other wolves except for the Himalayan wolf.

=== Different genetic types of gray wolf ===
Phylogenetic tree with timing in years for Canis lupus (Note: For a full set of supporting references refer to the note (a) in the phylotree at Evolution of the wolf#Wolf-like canids)

- 250,000
  - 120,000
    - 80,000
      - 31,000
        - Domestic dog
        - Holarctic grey wolf
      - Late Pleistocene wolf†
    - Indian plains wolf
  - Himalayan wolf

A haplotype is a group of genes found in an organism that are inherited together from one of their parents. A haplogroup is a group of similar haplotypes that share a single mutation inherited from their common ancestor. Mitochondrial DNA (mDNA) passes along the maternal line and can date back thousands of years. A 2005 study compared the mitochondrial DNA sequences of modern wolves with those from thirty-four specimens dated between 1856 and 1915. The historic population was found to possess twice the genetic diversity of modern wolves, which suggests that the mDNA diversity of the wolves eradicated from the western US was more than twice that of the modern population. A 2007 study compared mDNA sequences of modern wolves with those from Beringian wolves. The twenty Beringian wolves yielded sixteen haplotypes that could not be found in modern wolves, compared with seven haplotypes that were found in thirty-two modern Alaskan and Yukon wolves. This finding indicates that Beringian wolves were genetically distinct from modern wolves and possessed greater genetic diversity, and that there once existed in North America a larger wolf population than today. Modern Alaskan wolves have not descended from the Beringian wolves but from Eurasian wolves which migrated into North America during the Holocene.

Phylogenetic tree for wolves

- - - - - - haplogroup 1 North American wolves
          - haplogroup 1 most Eurasian wolves
        - haplogroup 2 some Eurasian wolves (including the Italian wolf)
      - haplogroup 2 Beringian wolves†
    - Himalayan wolf and Indian gray wolf

Simplified mDNA phylogeny for modern wolves and extinct Beringian wolves

A 2010 study compared mDNA sequences of modern wolves with those from 24 ancient wolf specimens from western Europe dated between 44,000 and 1,200 years before present (YBP). The study found that the sequences could be allocated into two haplogroups. Haplogroups 1 and 2 could be found among wolves across Eurasia but only haplogroup 1 could be found in North America. The ancient wolf samples from western Europe differed from modern wolves by 1 to 10 mutations, and all belonged to haplogroup 2, indicating its predominance in this region for over 40,000 years, both before and after the Last Glacial Maximum. A comparison of current and past frequencies indicates that in Europe haplogroup 2 became outnumbered by haplogroup 1 over the past several thousand years, but in North America haplogroup 2 – including the Beringian wolf – became extinct and was replaced by haplogroup 1 after the Last Glacial Maximum. However, a 2016 study did not support the existence of two wolf haplogroups.

A scenario consistent with the phylogenetic, ice sheet size, and sea-level depth data is that during the Late Pleistocene the sea levels were at their lowest. A single wave of wolf colonization into North America commenced with the opening of the Bering land bridge 70,000 YBP. It ended with the closing of the Yukon corridor that ran along the division between the Laurentide Ice Sheet and the Cordilleran Ice Sheet 23,000 YBP during the Late Glacial Maximum. As wolves had been in the fossil record of North America but the genetic ancestry of modern wolves could be traced back only 80,000 years, the wolf haplotypes that were already in North America were replaced by these invaders, either through competitive displacement or through genetic admixture. The replacement in North America of a basal population of wolves by a more recent one is consistent with the findings of earlier studies.

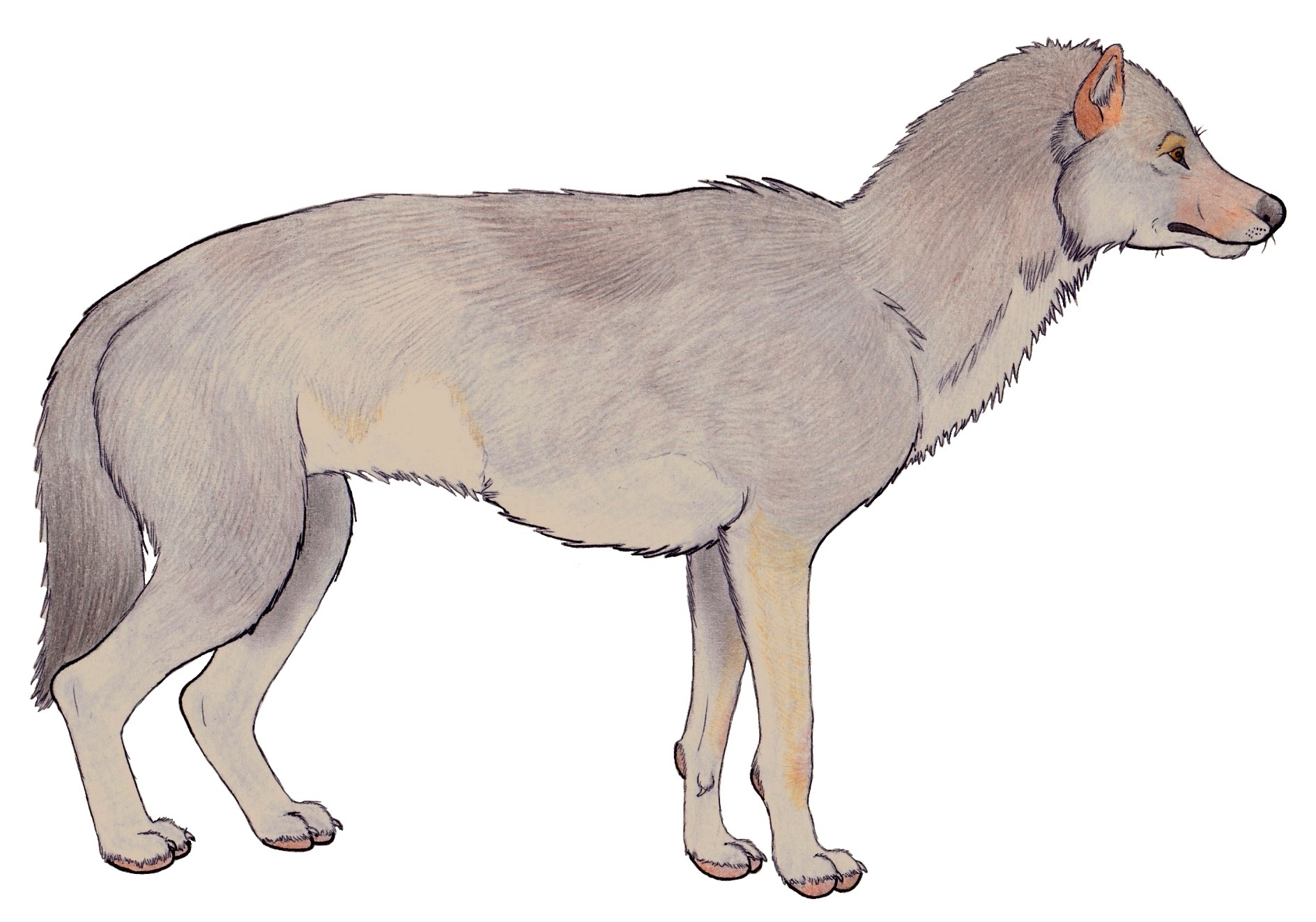
Artist's impression of the Beringian wolf

The Beringian wolves are morphologically and genetically comparable to Late Pleistocene European wolves. One study found that ancient wolves across Eurasia had a mDNA sequence identical to six Beringian wolves (indicating a common maternal ancestor). These wolves included a wolf from the Nerubajskoe-4 Paleolithic site, near Odesa, Ukraine, dated 30,000 YBP, a wolf from the Zaskalnaya-9 Paleolithic site, in Zaskalnaya on the Crimean Peninsula, dated 28,000 YBP, and the "Altai dog" from the Altai Mountains of Central Asia dated 33,000 YBP. Another wolf from the Vypustek cave, Czech Republic, dated 44,000 YBP had a mDNA sequence identical to two Beringian wolves (indicating another common maternal ancestor). The Beringian wolves are phylogenetically associated with a distinct group of four modern European mDNA haplotypes, which indicates that both ancient and extant North American wolves originated in Eurasia. Of these four modern haplotypes, one was only found in the Italian wolf and one only found among wolves in Romania. These four haplotypes fall, along with those of the Beringian wolves, under mDNA haplogroup 2. Ancient specimens of wolves with similar skull and dentition have been found in western Beringia (northeast Siberia), the Taimyr Peninsula, Ukraine, and Germany, where the European specimens are classified as Canis lupus spelaeus – the cave wolf. The Beringian wolves, and perhaps wolves across the mammoth steppe, were adapted to preying on now-extinct species through their unique skull and tooth morphology. This type of gray wolf that is adapted for preying on megafauna has been referred to as the Megafaunal wolf.

It is possible that a panmictic (random mating) wolf population, with gene flow spanning Eurasia and North America, existed until the closing of the ice sheets, after which the southern wolves became isolated, and only the Beringian wolf existed north of the sheets. The land bridge became inundated by the sea 10,000 YBP, and the ice sheets receded 12,000–6,000 YBP. The Beringian wolf became extinct, and the southern wolves expanded through the shrinking ice sheets to recolonize the northern part of North America. All North American wolves are descended from those that were once isolated south of the ice sheets. However, much of their diversity was later lost during the twentieth century due to eradication.

== Description ==
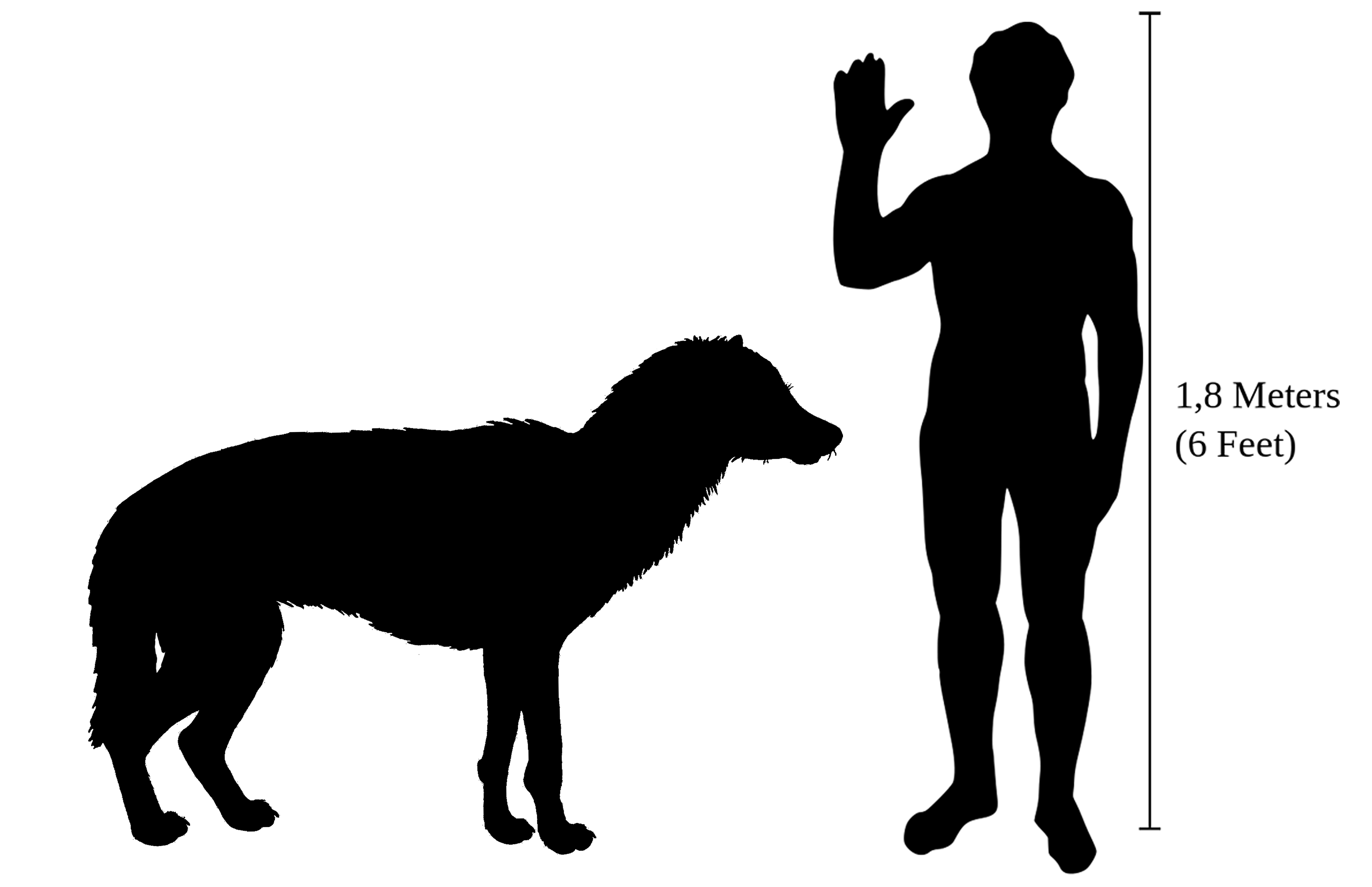
Beringian wolf size compared to a human

Olsen described the short-faced wolf skulls as follows:

The proportions of the skulls of these wolves that vary do so in the rostral area. The area of the skull that is anterior to the infraorbital foramen is noticeably foreshortened and constricted laterally in several of the skulls...Dishing of the rostrum, when viewed laterally, is evident in all of the short-faced skulls identified as Canis lupus from the Fairbanks gold fields. The occipital and supraoccipital crests are noticeably diminished compared to those found in average specimens of C. lupus. The occipital overhang of these crests, a wolf characteristic, is about equal in both groups of C. lupus...Examination of a large series of recent wolf skulls from the Alaskan area did not produce individuals with the same variations as those from the Fairbanks gold fields.

The Beringian wolf was similar in size to the modern Alaskan Interior wolf (C. l. pambasileus). The largest northern wolves today have a shoulder height not exceeding 97 cm (38 in) and a body length not exceeding 180 cm (71 in). The average weight of the Yukon wolf is 43 kg (95 lb) for males and 37 kg (82 lb) for females. Individual weights for Yukon wolves can vary from 21 to 55 kg (46 to 121 lb), with one Yukon wolf weighing 79.4 kg (175 lb). The Beringian wolves were also similar in size to the Late Pleistocene wolves whose remains have been found in the La Brea Tar Pits at Los Angeles, California. These wolves, referred to as Furlong's wolves (Canis lupus furlongi), were not physically different from modern gray wolves, the only differences being a broader femur bone and a longer tibial tuberosity – the insertion for the quadriceps and hamstring muscles – indicating that they had comparatively more powerful leg muscles for a fast take-off before a chase. The Beringian wolf was more robust, and possessed stronger jaws and teeth, than either Rancho La Brea or modern wolves.

During the Late Pleistocene, the more southerly occurring dire wolf (Aenocyon dirus) had the same shape and proportions as the Yukon wolf, but the dire wolf subspecies A. dirus guildayi is estimated to have weighed on average 60 kg (130 lb), and the subspecies A. dirus dirus on average 68 kg (150 lb), with some specimens being larger. The dire wolf was heavier than the Beringian wolf and possessed a more robust skull and dentition.

== Adaptation ==
Adaptation is the evolutionary process by which an organism becomes better able to live in its environment. The genetic differences between wolf populations is tightly associated with their type of habitat, and wolves disperse primarily within the type of habitat that they were born into. Ecological factors such as habitat type, climate, prey specialization, and predatory competition have been shown to greatly influence gray wolf craniodental plasticity, which is an adaptation of the cranium and teeth due to the influences of the environment. In the Late Pleistocene the variations between local environments would have encouraged a range of wolf ecotypes that were genetically, morphologically, and ecologically distinct from each another. The term ecomorph is used to describes a recognizable association of the morphology of an organism or a species with their use of the environment. The Beringian wolf ecomorph shows evolutionary craniodental plasticity not seen in past nor present North American gray wolves, and was well-adapted to the megafauna-rich environment of the Late Pleistocene.

=== Paleoecology ===
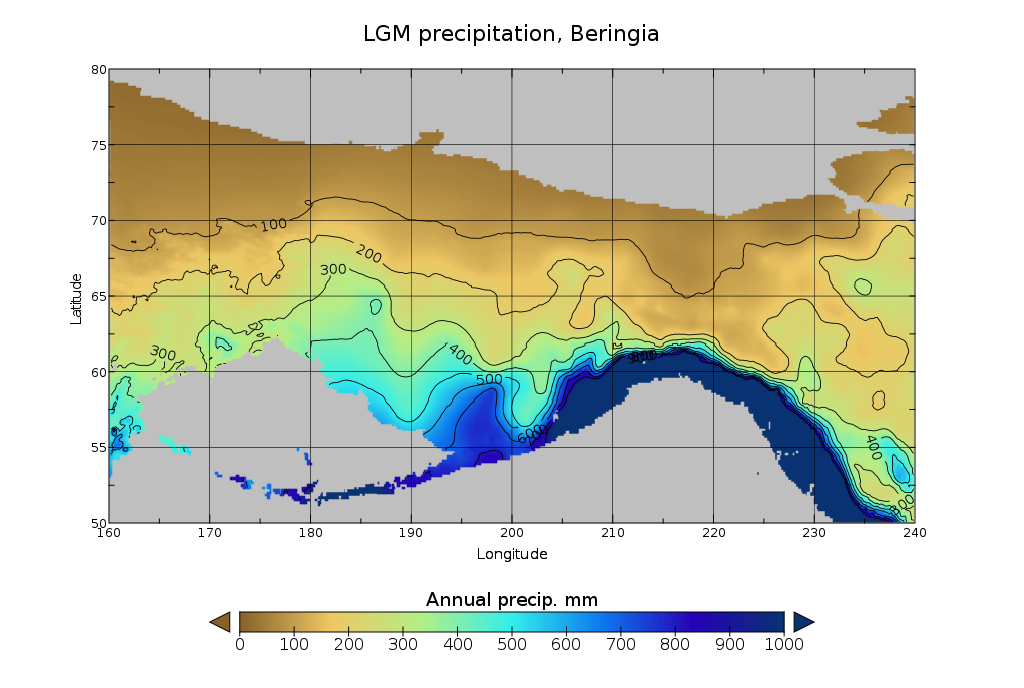
Beringia precipitation 22,000 years ago

The last glacial period, commonly referred to as the "Ice Age", spanned 125,000–14,500 YBP and was the most recent glacial period within the current ice age, which occurred during the last years of the Pleistocene era. The Ice Age reached its peak during the Last Glacial Maximum, when ice sheets began advancing 33,000 YBP and reached their maximum limits 26,500 YBP. Deglaciation commenced in the Northern Hemisphere approximately 19,000 YBP and in Antarctica approximately 14,500 YBP, which is consistent with evidence that glacial meltwater was the primary source for an abrupt rise in sea level 14,500 YBP and the Bering land bridge was finally inundated around 11,000 YBP. The fossil evidence from many continents points to the extinction of large animals, termed Pleistocene megafauna, near the end of the last glaciation.

During the Ice Age a vast, cold and dry mammoth steppe stretched from the Arctic islands southwards to China, and from Spain eastwards across Eurasia and over the Bering land bridge into Alaska and the Yukon, where it was blocked by the Wisconsin glaciation. The land bridge existed because sea levels were lower due to more of the planet's water being locked up in glaciers compared with today. Therefore, the flora and fauna of Beringia were more related to those of Eurasia rather than to those of North America. In eastern Beringia from 35,000 YBP the northern Arctic areas experienced temperatures 1.5 °C (2.7 °F) warmer than today, but the southern sub-Arctic regions were 2 °C (3.6 °F) cooler. In 22,000 YBP, during the Last Glacial Maximum, the average summer temperature was 3–5 °C (5.4–9.0 °F) cooler than today, with variations of 2.9 °C (5.2 °F) cooler on the Seward Peninsula to 7.5 °C (13.5 °F) cooler in the Yukon.

Beringia received more moisture and intermittent maritime cloud cover from the north Pacific Ocean than the rest of the Mammoth steppe, including the dry environments on either side of it. Moisture occurred along a north–south gradient with the south receiving the most cloud cover and moisture due to the airflow from the North Pacific. This moisture supported a shrub-tundra habitat that provided an ecological refugium for plants and animals. In this Beringian refugium, eastern Beringia's vegetation included isolated pockets of larch and spruce forests with birch and alder trees. This environment supported large herbivores that were prey for Beringian wolves and their competitors. Steppe bison (Bison priscus), Yukon horse (Equus lambei), woolly mammoth (Mammuthus primigenius), and Wild yak (Bos mutus) consumed grasses, sedges, and herbaceous plants. Caribou (Rangifer tarandus) and woodland muskox (Symbos cavifrons) consumed tundra plants, including lichen, fungi, and mosses.

=== Prey ===
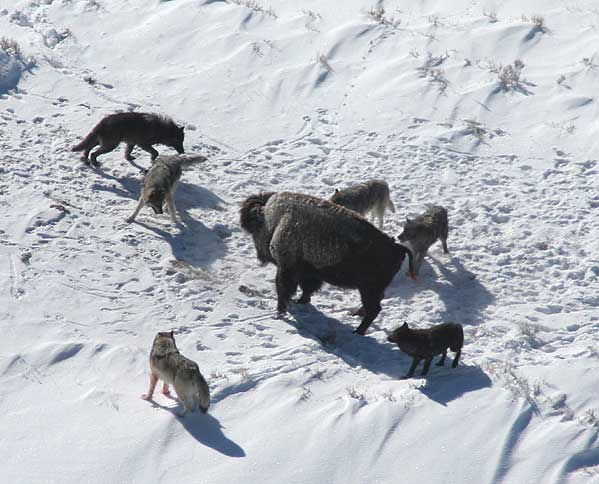
Bison surrounded by a gray wolf pack. Beringian wolves preyed most often on steppe bison and horse.

Isotope analysis can be used to allow researchers to make inferences about the diet of the species being studied. Two isotope analyses of bone collagen extracted from the remains of Late Pleistocene wolves found in Beringia and Belgium indicate that wolves from both areas preyed mainly on Pleistocene megafauna, which became rare at the beginning of the Holocene 12,000 years ago. The Beringian wolf preyed most often on horse and steppe bison. In the period leading up to the Last Glacial Maximum (50,000 YBP–23,000 YBP), they also ate woodland muskox, and after this time they also ate mammoth. The analysis supports the conclusion that these wolves were capable of killing and dismembering large prey.

In another stable isotope analysis, half of the Beringian wolves were found to be musk ox and caribou specialists, and the other half were either horse and bison specialists or generalists. Two wolves from the full-glacial period (23,000–18,000 YBP) were found to be mammoth specialists, but it is not clear if this was due to scavenging or predation. The analysis of other carnivore fossils from the Fairbanks region of Alaska found that mammoth was rare in the diets of the other Beringian carnivores.

A stable isotope analysis of a mummified Beringian wolf pup dated 56,000 YBP that was recovered near the Klondike river revealed that most of its diet - and therefore its mother's diet - was based on aquatic rather than animal resources. The aquatic resources was proposed to be salmon.

=== Dentition ===
A 2007 study of Canis dentition shows that in comparison with the modern gray wolf and the Pleistocene La Brea wolf, the Beringian wolf possessed large carnassial teeth and a short, broad palate relative to the size of its skull. The row length of the Beringian wolf's premolars was longer, the P4 premolar (the upper carnassial) longer and wider, and the M1, M2, and m1 (the lower carnassial) molars longer than those found in the other two types of wolves. The Beringian wolf's short, broad rostrum increased the force of a bite made with the canine teeth while strengthening the skull against the stresses caused by struggling prey. Today, the relatively deep jaws similar to those of the Beringian wolf can be found in the bone-cracking spotted hyena and in those canids that are adapted for taking large prey. Beringian wolves possessed a craniodental morphology that was more specialized than modern gray wolves and Rancho La Brea wolves for capturing, dismembering, and consuming the bones of very large megaherbivores, having evolved this way due to the presence of megafauna. Their stronger jaws and teeth indicate a hypercarnivorous lifestyle.

An accepted sign of domestication is the presence of tooth crowding, in which the orientation and alignment of the teeth are described as touching, overlapping or being rotated. However, a 2017 study found that 18% of Beringian wolf specimens exhibit tooth crowding compared with 9% for modern wolves and 5% for domestic dogs. These specimens predate the arrival of humans and therefore there is no possibility of cross-breeding with dogs. The study indicates that tooth crowding can be a natural occurrence in some wolf ecomorphs and cannot be used to differentiate ancient wolves from early dogs.

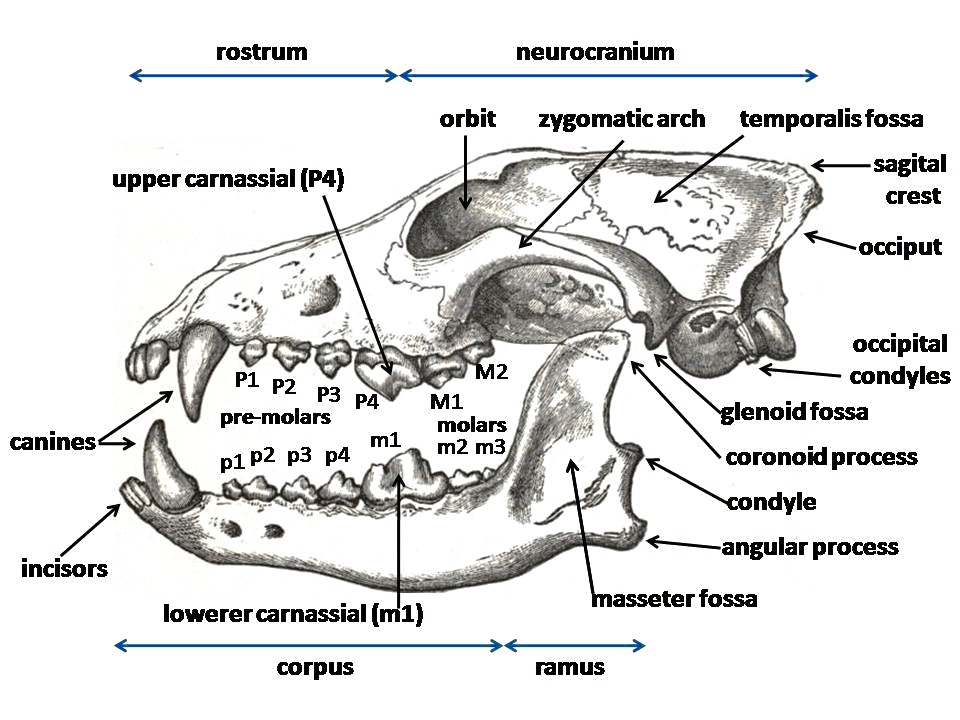
Diagram of a wolf skull with key features labelled

North American gray wolves compared by mean mandible tooth measurements (millimeters)
Tooth variable	modern North America	Rancho La Brea	Eastern Beringia
premolar row length	63.4	63.6	69.3
palate width	64.9	67.6	76.6
P4 length	25.1	26.3	26.7
P4 width	10.1	10.6	11.4
M1 length	16.4	16.5	16.6
M2 length	8.7	8.9	9.2
m1 length	28.2	28.9	29.6
m1 trigonid length	19.6	21.9	20.9
m1 width	10.7	11.3	11.1

=== Tooth breakage ===
Dentition of an Ice Age wolf showing functions of the teeth

Tooth breakage is related to a carnivore's behavior. The mandibles of canids are buttressed behind the carnassial teeth to enable them to crack bones with their post-carnassial teeth (molars M2 and M3). A study found that the modern gray wolf possesses greater buttressing when compared to all other extant canids and the extinct dire wolf. This indicates that the gray wolf is better adapted for cracking bone than other canids. In comparison to extant North American gray wolves, Beringian wolves included many more individuals with moderately to heavily worn teeth and with a significantly greater number of broken teeth. The frequencies of fracture in wolves ranged from a minimum of 2% found in the Northern Rocky Mountain wolf (Canis lupus irremotus) up to a maximum of 11% found in Beringian wolves. The distribution of fractures across the tooth row also differs, with Beringian wolves having much higher frequencies of fracture for incisors, carnassials, and molars. A similar pattern was observed in spotted hyenas, suggesting that increased incisor and carnassial fracture reflects habitual bone consumption because bones are gnawed with the incisors and then cracked with the carnassials and molars. The risk of tooth fracture is also higher when taking and consuming large prey.

=== Competitors ===
In addition to the Beringian wolf, other Beringian carnivores included the Eurasian cave lion (Panthera spelaea), scimitar-toothed cat (Homotherium serum), giant short-faced bear (Arctodus simus), and the omnivorous brown bear (Ursus arctos). Beringian wolves would have faced competition for the carcasses of large herbivores from the formidable giant short-faced bear, a scavenger. Additionally, humans had reached the Bluefish Caves in the Yukon Territory by 24,000 YBP, with cutmarks being found there on specimens of Yukon horse, steppe bison, caribou (Rangifer tarandus), wapiti (Cervus canadensis), and Dall sheep (Ovis dalli).

A 1993 study proposed that the higher frequency of tooth breakage among Pleistocene carnivores compared with living carnivores was not the result of hunting larger game, something that might be assumed from the larger size of the former. When there is low prey availability, the competition between carnivores increases, causing them to eat faster and consume more bone, leading to tooth breakage. Compared to modern wolves, the high frequency of tooth fracture in Beringian wolves indicates higher carcass consumption due to higher carnivore density and increased competition. This proposal was challenged in 2019, when a survey of modern wolf behavior over the past 30 years showed that when there was less prey available, the rates of tooth fracture more than doubled. This suggests that large Pleistocene carnivores experienced more periods of limited food availability when compared with their modern counterparts.

== Range ==
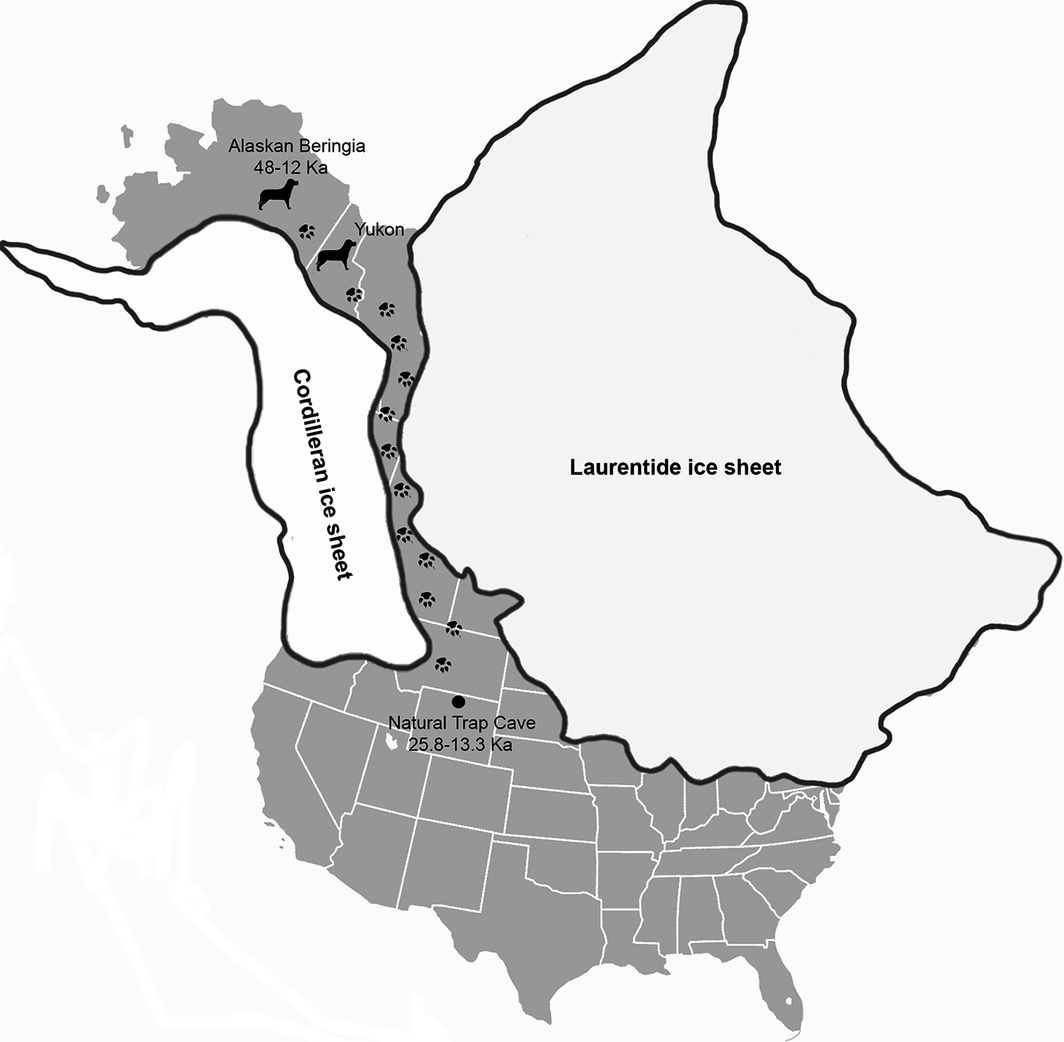
Path of Beringian wolves from Alaska to the Natural Trap Cave, Wyoming (denoted with a black dot). Dog icons represent sites where Beringian wolves have previously been found, and paw prints represent the proposed path through the ice sheets.

The remains of Beringian wolves have been found in Alaska and as far eastward as the Yukon in Canada. Specimens that have been identified by their skull morphology and limb morphology to be Beringian wolves have been found in the Natural Trap Cave at the base of the Bighorn Mountains in Wyoming, United States. These were radiocarbon dated to between 25,800 and 14,300 YBP, and this location is directly south of what would at that time have been the division between the Laurentide Ice Sheet and the Cordilleran Ice Sheet. This suggests that a temporary channel existed between the glaciers from 25,800 YBP until the advance of the ice sheets 16,000–13,000 YBP. The migration of the Beringian wolf southwards is assumed to have been the result of pursuing prey species, as this cave also contained specimens of steppe bison that had migrated from Beringia and would have been prey for wolves, and musk ox that is known to be an important prey species of the Beringian wolf. Dire wolves were absent north of 42°N latitude in the Late Pleistocene; therefore, this region would have been available for Beringian wolves to expand southwards. There is no evidence of expansion beyond this region.

== Extinction ==
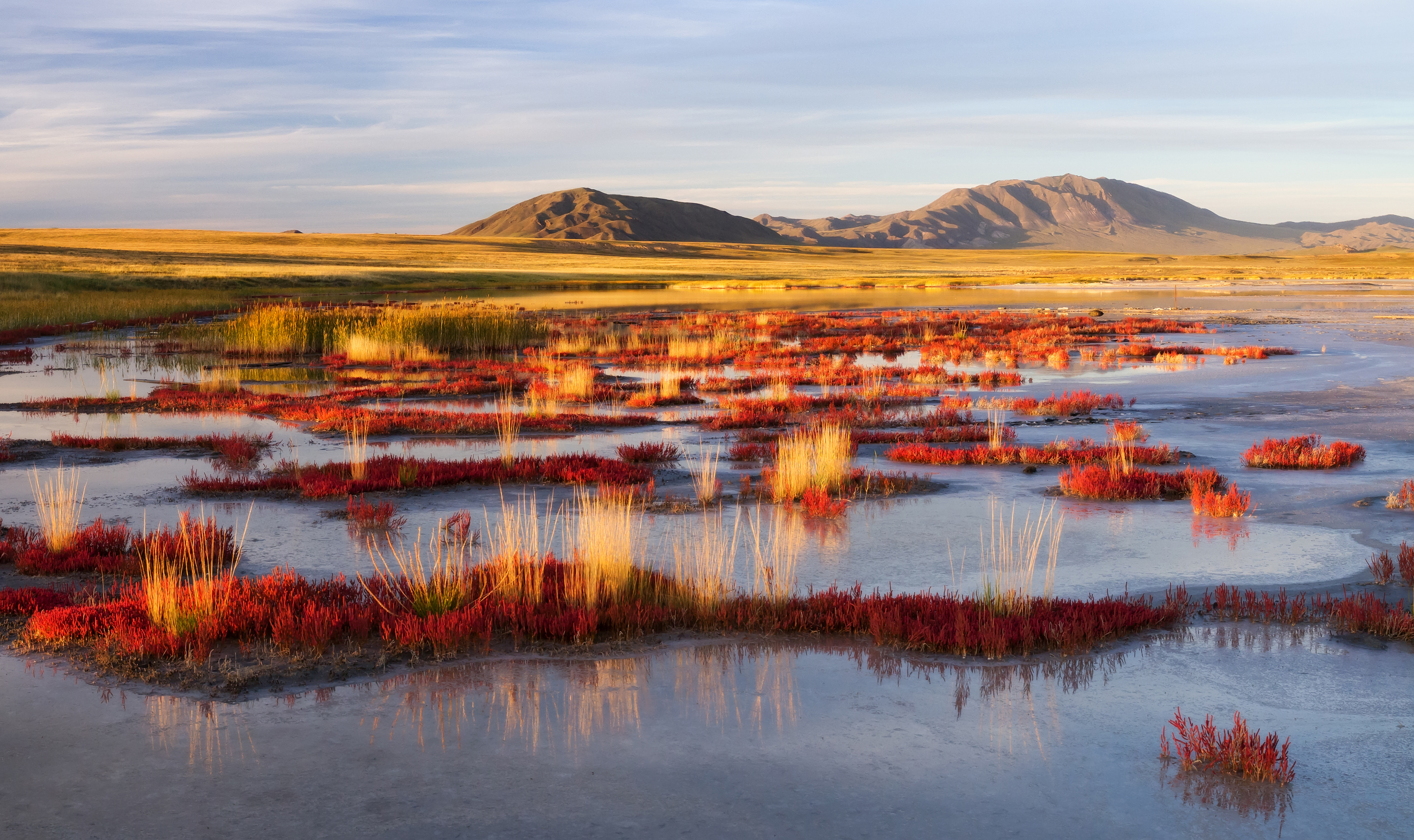
Ubsunur Hollow Biosphere Reserve on the border between Russia and Mongolia, is one of the last remnants of the mammoth steppe.

Extinction is the result of the elimination of the geographic range of a species with a reduction of its population size down to zero. The factors that affect biogeographic range and population size include competition, predator-prey interactions, variables of the physical environment, and chance events.

=== Phenotype is extinct ===
A phenotype is any observable and measurable characteristic of an organism and includes any morphological, behavioral, and physiological traits, with these characteristics being influenced by genes and the environment. The mammoth steppe lasted for 100,000 years without change until it came to an end around 12,000 years ago. The American megafaunal extinction event occurred 12,700 YBP when 90 genera of mammals weighing over 44 kilograms (97 lb) became extinct. The extinction of the large carnivores and scavengers is thought to have been caused by the extinction of the megaherbivore prey upon which they depended. The cause of the extinction of this megafauna is debated but has been attributed to the impact of climate change, competition with other species, including humans, or a combination of both factors. For those mammals with modern representatives, ancient DNA and radiocarbon data indicate that the local genetic populations were replaced by others from within the same species or by others of the same genus.

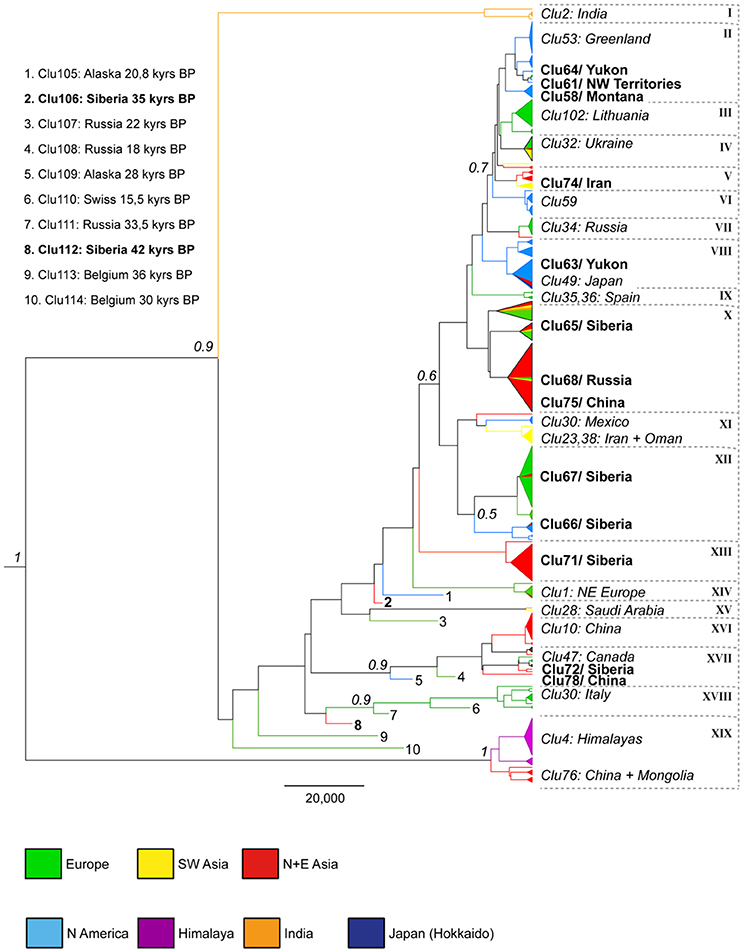
Phylogenetic tree based on the mDNA of wolves. The modern wolf clade XVI from China/Mongolia shares a haplotype with a Beringian wolf (Alaska 28,000 YBP).

Postglacial environmental change throughout eastern Beringia brought about wholesale changes in vegetation, the regional extinction of much of the megafauna, and the entrance of Homo sapiens. The large Late Pleistocene carnivores that were more carnivorous than their competitors faced greater vulnerability to extinction. The Beringian cave lion, saber-toothed cat, and short-faced bear went extinct at the same time as their large megafaunal prey. The omnivorous coyote, American black bear, brown bear, puma and bobcat survived. Both the Beringian wolf and the dire wolf went extinct in North America, leaving only the less carnivorous and more gracile form of the wolf to thrive. One extinction theory holds that the Beringian wolf was outcompeted and replaced by the ancestor of the modern gray wolf.

The radiocarbon dating of the skeletal remains from 56 Beringian wolves showed a continuous population, from over 50,800 calibrated YBP until 12,500 YBP with the exception of one specimen (AMNH F:AM 30450) dated to 8,645–8,406 calibrated YBP. This indicates that their population was in decline after 12,500 YBP, although megafaunal prey was still available in this region until 10,500 YBP. The timing of this latter specimen is supported by the recovery of mammoth and horse DNA from sediments dated 10,500 YBP–7,600 YBP from the interior of Alaska, and steppe bison dated 5,400 YBP from the Yukon. The timing for the extinction of horses in North America and the minimum population size for North American bison coincide with the extinction of an entire wolf haplogroup in North America, indicating that the disappearance of their prey caused the extinction of this wolf ecomorph. This resulted in a significant loss of phenotypic and genetic diversity within the species.

=== Haplotype is not extinct ===
There are parts of Central Eurasia where the environment is considered to be stable over the past 40,000 years. In 2016 a study compared mDNA sequences of ancient wolf specimens with those from modern wolves, including specimens from the remote regions of North America, Russia, and China. One ancient haplotype that had once existed in both Alaska (Eastern Beringia 28,000 YBP) and Russia (Medvezya "Bear" Cave, Pechora area, Northern Urals 18,000 YBP) was shared by modern wolves found living in Mongolia and China (indicating a common maternal ancestor). The study found that the genetic diversity of past wolves was lost at the beginning of the Holocene in Alaska, Siberia, and Europe, and that there is limited overlap with modern wolves. The study did not support two wolf haplogroups that had been proposed by earlier studies. For the ancient wolves of North America, instead of an extinction/replacement model indicated by other studies, this study found substantial evidence of a population bottleneck (reduction) in which the ancient wolf diversity was almost lost at the beginning of the Holocene. In Eurasia, the loss of many ancient lineages cannot be simply explained and appears to have been slow across time with reasons unclear.

=== Descendants ===
In 2021, an mDNA analysis of modern and extinct North American wolf-like canines indicates that the Beringian wolf was the ancestor of the southern wolf clade, which includes the Mexican wolf and the Great Plains wolf. The Mexican wolf is the most ancestral of the gray wolves that live in North America today. The modern coyote appeared around 10,000 years ago. The most genetically basal coyote mDNA clade pre-dates the Late Glacial Maximum and is a haplotype that can only be found in the Eastern wolf. This implies that the large, wolf-like Pleistocene coyote was the ancestor of the Eastern wolf. Further, another ancient haplotype detected in the Eastern wolf can be found only in the Mexican wolf. The study proposes that Pleistocene coyote and Beringian wolf admixture led to the Eastern wolf long before the arrival of the modern coyote and the modern wolf.
