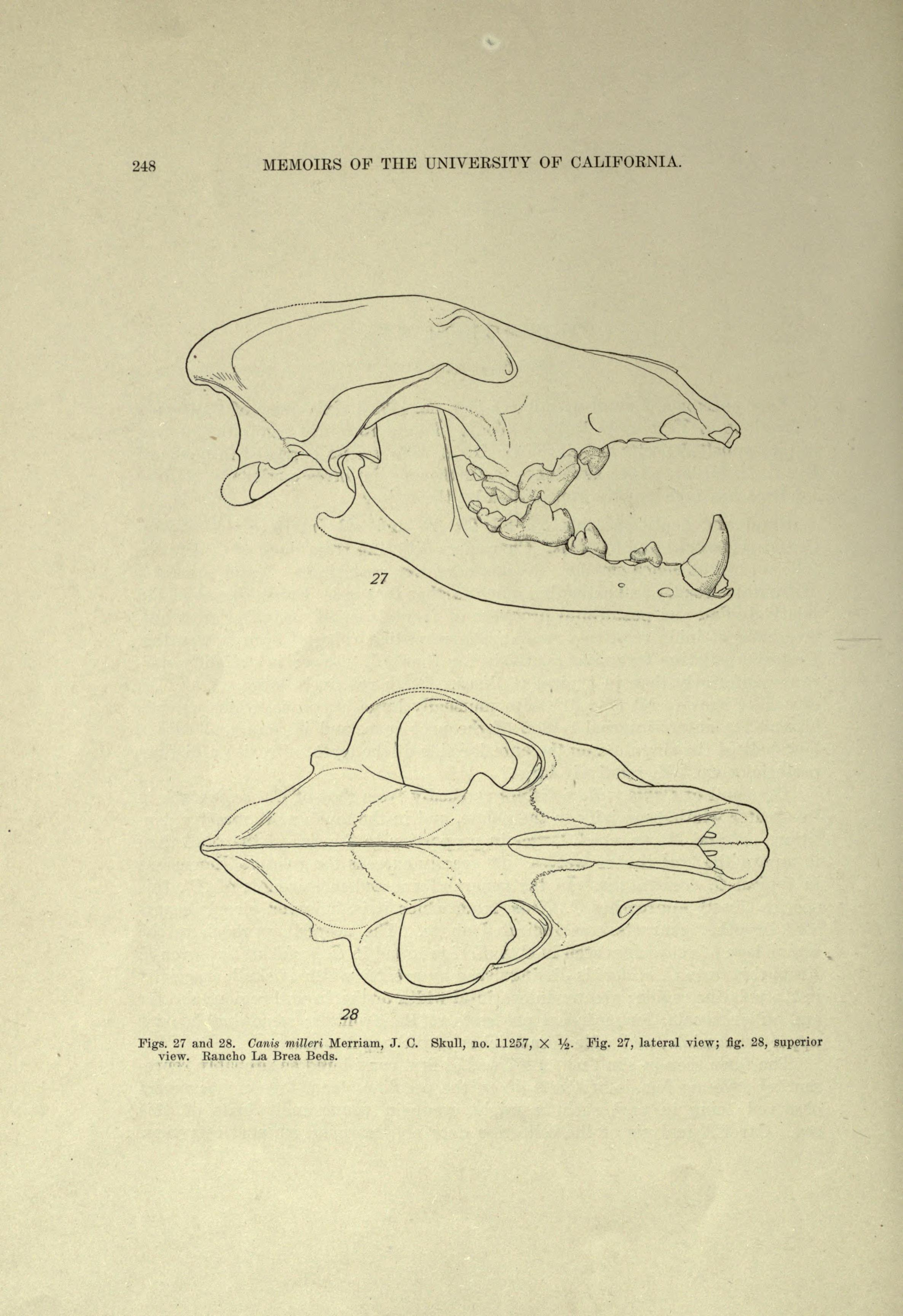
- Illustration from The fauna of Rancho La Brea (under the synonymous name Canis milleri).

Scientific classification
- Kingdom: Animalia
- Phylum: Chordata
- Class: Mammalia
- Order: Carnivora
- Family: Canidae
- Genus: Canis
- Species: C. lupus
- Subspecies: †C. l. furlongi

Trinomial name
- †Canis lupus furlongi (Merriam, 1910)

Synonyms
- List: Canis occidentalis furlongi Merriam, 1910; Canis furlongi; Canis milleri Merriam, 1911; Canis (Aenocyon) milleri; Aenocyon milleri

= Canis lupus furlongi =

Canis lupus furlongi Temporal range: Late Pleistocene

Extinct subspecies of grey wolf

Canis lupus furlongi, or Furlong's wolf, is a fossil subspecies of grey wolf which lived during the Late Pleistocene.

== Taxonomy ==
In 1910, American palaeontologist John Campbell Merriam described a subspecies of wolf Canis occidentalis furlongi based on several fragmentary remains from the La Brea Tar Pits. A year later, he described a larger wolf which he named Canis milleri. The specimens belonging to this wolf were collected from the same area. Robert A. Allen synonymised Canis milleri into Canis lupus in 1969, as a result of similar measurements between the type specimen of C. milleri and a C. lupus specimen.

It had been previously suggested that C. l. furlongi was the result of hybridisation between another grey wolf subspecies and the dire wolf. However, a 2021 study suggested reproductive isolation prevented dire wolves to hybridise with related canid species such as wolves and dogs, possibly being a factor to their extinction.

=== Evolution ===
The phylogenetic descent of the extant wolf C. lupus from the earlier C. mosbachensis (which in turn descended from C. etruscus) is widely accepted. Gray wolves (Canis lupus) migrated from Eurasia into North America 70,000–23,000 years ago and gave rise to at least two morphologically and genetically distinct groups. One group is represented by the extinct Beringian wolf and the other by the modern populations.

== Description ==
Canis lupus furlongi is not morphologically distinct from modern wolf populations, only differing in having a broader femur bone and a longer tibial tuberosity – the insertion for the quadriceps and hamstring muscles – indicating that they had comparatively more powerful leg muscles for a fast take-off before a chase. This wolf subspecies is similar in size to the Beringian wolf, whose remains have been found at Alaska, Yukon, and northern British Columbia.

== Adaptability ==
=== Palaeoecology ===
The last glacial period, commonly referred to as the "Ice Age", spanned 125,000–14,500 YBP and was the most recent glacial period within the current ice age, which occurred during the last years of the Pleistocene era. The Ice Age reached its peak during the Last Glacial Maximum, when ice sheets began advancing from 33,000 YBP and reached their maximum limits 26,500 YBP. Deglaciation commenced in the Northern Hemisphere approximately 19,000 YBP and in Antarctica approximately 14,500 YBP, which is consistent with evidence that glacial meltwater was the primary source for an abrupt rise in sea level 14,500 YBP. Access into northern North America was blocked by the Wisconsin glaciation. The fossil evidence from the Americas points to the extinction mainly of large animals, termed Pleistocene megafauna, near the end of the last glaciation.

=== Competitors ===
Remains of Furlong's wolf are rare when compared to the dire wolf, hinting that Furlong's wolf didn't thrive in environments with dire wolves. This suggests the dire wolf was the dominant wolf in California during the Pleistocene epoch.
