= Ecomorphology =

Relation between ecologicals role of individual and morphologic adaptations

Ecomorphology or ecological morphology is the study of the relationship between the ecological role of an individual and its morphological adaptations. The term "morphological" here is in the anatomical context. Both the morphology and ecology exhibited by an organism are directly or indirectly influenced by their environment, and ecomorphology aims to identify the differences. Current research places emphasis on linking morphology and ecological niche by measuring the performance of traits (i.e. sprint speed, bite force, etc.) associated behaviours, and fitness outcomes of the relationships.

Current ecomorphological research focuses on a functional approach and application to the science. A broadening of this field welcomes further research in the debate regarding differences between both the ecological and morphological makeup of an organism.

== Development of ecomorphology ==
The roots of ecomorphology date back to the late 19th century. Then, description and comparison of morphological form, primarily for use in avian classification, was focal point of morphological research. However, during the 1930s and 40s morphology as a field shrank. This was likely due to the emergence of new areas of biological inquiry enabled by new techniques. The 1950s brought about not only a change in the approach of morphological studies, resulting in the development of evolutionary morphology in the form of theoretical questions, and a resurgence of interest in the field. High-speed cinematography and x-ray cinematography began to allow for observations of movements of parts while electromyography allowed for observation of the integration of muscle activities. Together, these methodologies allowed morphologists to better delve into the intricacies of their study. It was then, in the 1950s and 60s, that ecologists began to use morphological measures to study evolutionary and ecological questions. This culminated in Karr and James coining the term "ecomorphology" in 1975. The following year the links between vertebrate morphology and ecology were finally established creating the foundations of modern ecomorphology.

== Ecomorphology ==
=== Ecomorphology and functional morphology ===
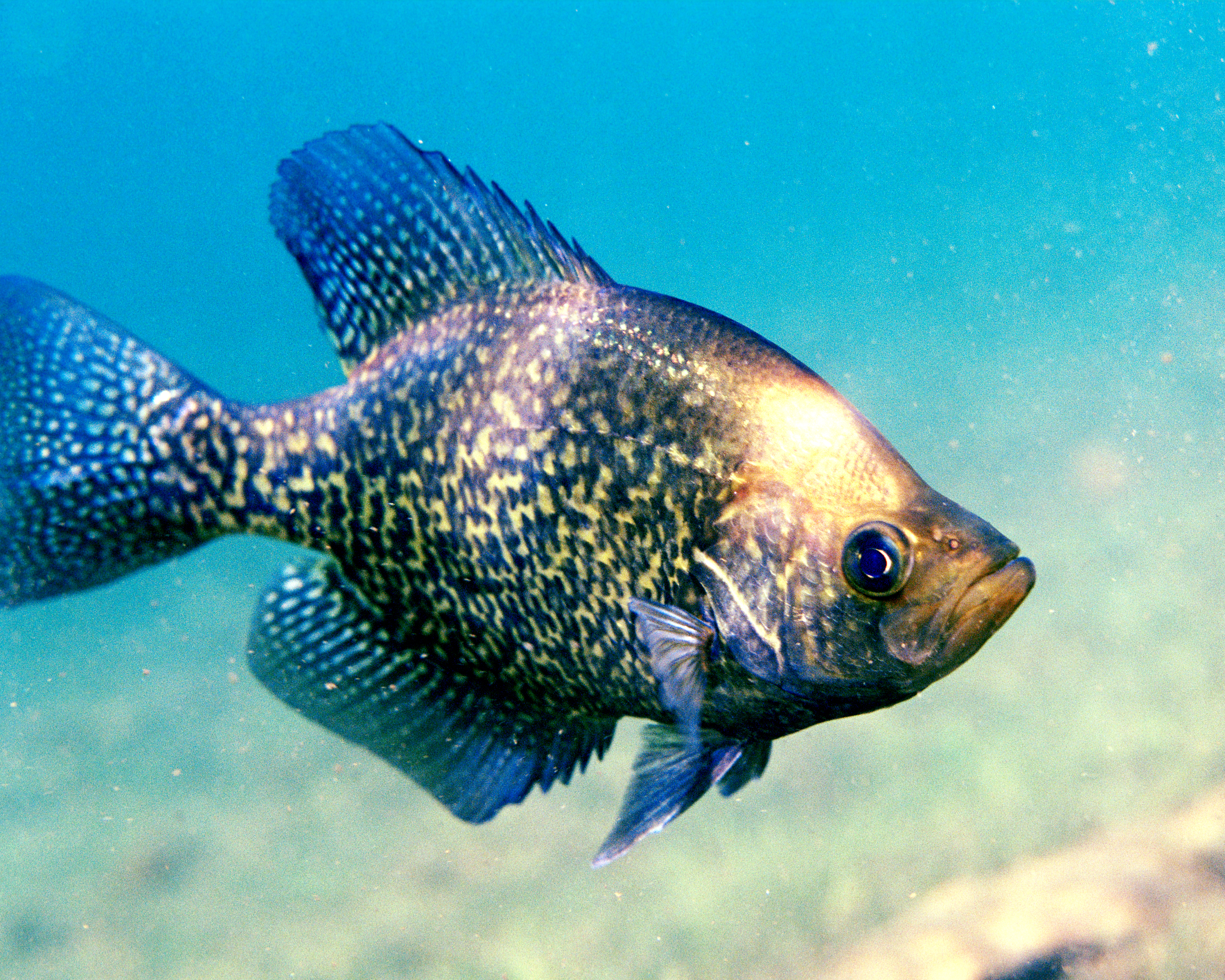
Ecomorphological relationships have been demonstrated between jaw structure and the feeding biology of sunfish.

Functional morphology differs from ecomorphology in that it deals with the features arising from form at varying levels of organisation. Ecomorphology, on the other hand, refers to those features which can be shown to derive from the ecology surrounding the species. In other words, functional morphology focuses heavily on the relationship between form and function whereas ecomorphology is interested in the form and the influences from which it arises. Functional morphology studies often investigate relationships between the form of Skeletal muscle and physical properties such as force generation and joint mobility. This means that functional morphology experiments may be done under laboratory conditions whereas ecomorphological experiments may not. Moreover, studies of functional morphology themselves provide insufficient data upon which to make conclusions regarding environmental adaptations of a species. The data provided from these studies can, however, support and enrich the understanding of a species' ecomorphological adaptations. For instance, the relationship between the organization of the jaw lever-arm system, mouth size, and jaw muscle force generation and the feeding behaviour of sunfish has been investigated. Work of this variety lends scientific support to seemingly intuitive concepts. For instance, increases in mouth size correspond to an increase in prey size. However, less obvious trends also exist. The prey-size of fish does not seem to correlate so much to body size as to the characteristics of the feeding apparatus.

=== Behavioural studies ===
The work above is just one example of an ecomorphology based behavioural study. Studies of this variety are becoming increasingly important in the field. Behavioural studies interrelate functional and eco-morphology. Features such as locomotory ability in foraging birds have been shown to affect dietary preferences by studies of this type. Behavioural studies are particularly common in fisheries and in studying birds. Other studies attempt to relate ecomorphological findings with the dietary habits of species. Griffen and Mosblack (2011) investigated differences in diet and consumption rate as a function of gut ecomorphology. Indeed, gut volume was found to correlate positively to increasing metabolic rate. Ecomorphological studies can often be used to determine to presence of parasites in a given temporospatial context as parasite presence can alter host habitat use.

Other current work within ecomorphology focuses on broadening the knowledge base to allow for ecomorphological studies to incorporate a wider range of habitats, taxa, and systems. Much current work also focuses on the integration of ecomorphology with other comparative fields such as phylogenetics and ontogenetics to better understand evolutionary morphology.

== Applications of ecomorphology ==
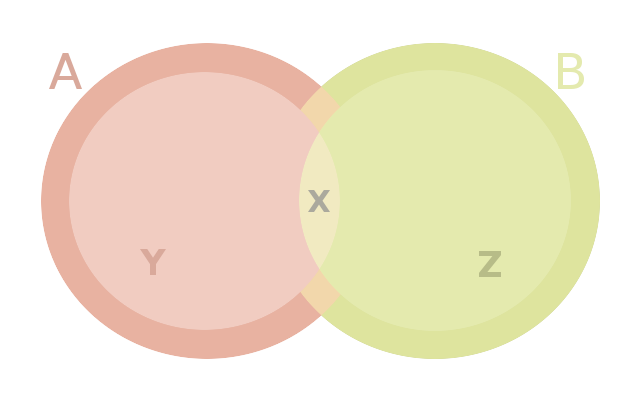
Simplified representation of an ecological niche where A and B show the fundamental niches of species 1 and species 2 respectively. Z the realised niche of species 2 and X the niche overlap, where competition occurs among species.

An understanding of ecomorphology is necessary when investigating both the origins of and reasons for biodiversity within a species. Ecomorphology is fundamental for understanding changes in the morphology of a species in which subsets occupy different ecological niches, demonstrate different reproductive techniques, and have various sensory modalities. Studies conducted on species with high biodiversity frequently investigate the extent to which species morphology is influenced by their ecology. Bony fishes are often used to study ecomorphology due to their long evolutionary history, high biodiversity, and multi-stage life cycle. Studies on the morphological diversity of African cichlids conducted by Fryer and Iles were some of the first to demonstrate ecomorphology, . This is largely due to cichlids having great biodiversity, wide distribution, the ability to occupy various ecological niches, and obvious morphological differences. Ecomorphology is also often used to study the paleohabitat of a species and/or its evolutionary morphology.

=== Paleohabitat determination from ecomorphology ===
The history of how a species has undergone morphological adaptations to better suit its ecological role can be used to draw conclusions about its paleohabitat. The morphologies of paleo-species found at a location help to make inferences about the previous appearance and properties of that habitat. Research using this approach has been widely conducted using bovid fossils due to their large skeletons and extensive species radiation. Plummer and Bishop conducted a study using extant African bovids to investigate the animal's paleoenvironment based on their habitat preference. The strong correlation found between bovid phylogeny and habitat preference suggests that linking morphology and habitat is taxon dependent. Evidence also suggests that further study of the ecomorphology of previously existing habitats may be useful in determining the phylogenetic risk associated with species living in a specific habitat.

=== Evolutionary morphology ===
The study of evolutionary morphology concerns changes in species morphology over time in order to become better suited to their environment. These studies are conducted by comparing the features of species groups to provide a historical narrative of the changes in morphology observed with changes in habitat. A background history of a species features and homology must first be known before a history of evolutionary morphology can be observed. This area of biology serves only to provide a nominal explanation of evolutionary biology, as a more in depth explanation of species history is required to provide a thorough explanation of evolution within a species.

=== Ecomorphology versus habitat preference ===
Suggestions have been made that the correlations between species biodiversity and particular environments may not necessarily be due to ecomorphology, but rather a conscious decision made by species to relocate to an ecosystem to which their morphologies are better suited. However, there are currently no studies that provide concrete evidence to support this theory. Studies have been conducted to predict fish habitat preference based on body morphology, but no definitive distinction could be made between correlation and causation of fish habitat preference.
