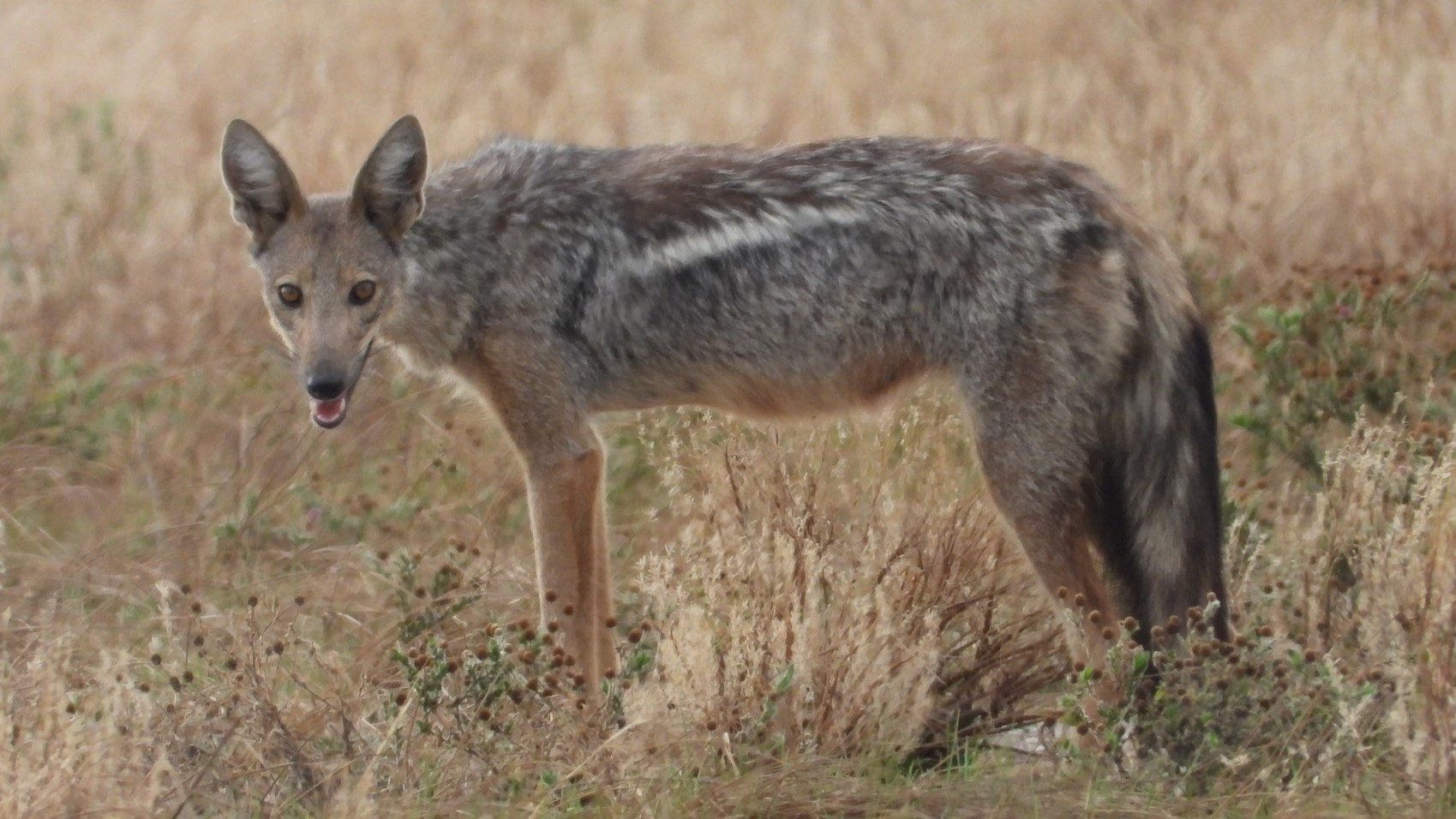
- Side-striped jackal in Kalabo, Zambia

Conservation status
- Least Concern (IUCN 3.1)

Scientific classification
- Kingdom: Animalia
- Phylum: Chordata
- Class: Mammalia
- Infraclass: Placentalia
- Order: Carnivora
- Family: Canidae
- Genus: Lupulella
- Species: L. adusta

Binomial name
- Lupulella adusta (Sundevall, 1847)
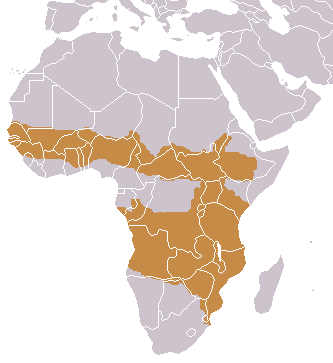
- Side-striped jackal range

Synonyms
- Canis adustus

= Side-striped jackal =

Side-striped jackal Temporal range: Pliocene - recent

Canine native to Africa

The side-striped jackal (Lupulella adusta or Schaeffia adusta) is a canine native to Central and Southern Africa.

The side-striped jackal has a much wider distribution than the better-known black-backed Jackal, but there are large parts of their range with no information on their population status.

== Taxonomy and evolution ==
Phylogenetic tree of the wolf-like canids with timing in millions of years (Note: For a full set of supporting references refer to the note (a) in the phylotree at Evolution of the wolf#Wolf-like canids)

- Caninae 3.5 Ma
  - 3.0
    - 2.5
      - 2.0
        - 0.96
          - 0.6
            - 0.38
              - - - Domestic dog
                  - Gray wolf
              - Coyote
            - African wolf
          - Golden jackal
        - Ethiopian wolf
      - Dhole
    - African wild dog
  - - 2.6
      - Side-striped jackal
      - Black-backed jackal

The Swedish zoologist Carl Jakob Sundevall named the species Canis adustus in 1847. The German zoologist Max Hilzheimer proposed a different genus as Schaeffia adusta in 1906.

Fossil remains of the side-striped jackal date to the Pliocene era. A mitochondrial DNA sequence alignment for the wolf-like canids gave a phylogenetic tree with the side-striped jackal and the black-backed jackal being the most basal members of this clade, which means that this tree is indicating an African origin for the clade.

In 2019, a workshop hosted by the IUCN/SSC Canid Specialist Group recommends that because DNA evidence shows the side-striped jackal (Canis adustus) and black-backed jackal (Canis mesomelas) to form a monophyletic lineage that sits outside of the Canis/Cuon/Lycaon clade, that they should be placed in a distinct genus, Lupulella Hilzheimer, 1906 with the names Lupulella adusta and Lupulella mesomelas.

Studies indicate that the dentition of the side-striped jackal is different to that of the black-backed jackal, and propose that the side-striped jackal should be classified as Schaeffia adusta following Hilzheimer in 1906. It is the surviving member from an African group of which the early Pliocene African Eucyon khoikhoi sp. nov. is the basal member. The recent discovery of the 5 million years old E. khoikhoi supports the proposed radiation of the genus Eucyon, with the oldest E. ferox in North America, to E. davisi in North America then to China, to E. debonisi in Western Europe, to E. khoikhoi in Africa.

== Description ==
The side-striped jackal is a slender, medium-sized canid, which tends to be slightly larger on average than the black-backed jackal. Body mass ranges from 6.5 to 14 kg (14 to 31 lb), head-and-body length from 69 to 81 cm (27 to 32 in) and tail length from 30 to 41 cm (12 to 16 in). Shoulder height can range from 35 to 50 cm (14 to 20 in). Its pelt is coloured buff-grey. The back is darker grey than the underside, and the tail is black with a grey, almost silver tip. Indistinct white stripes are present on the flanks, running from elbow to hip. The boldness of the markings varies between individuals, with those of adults being better defined than those of juveniles.

The side-striped jackal's skull is similar to that of the black-backed jackal's, but is flatter, with a longer and narrower rostrum. Its sagittal crest and zygomatic arches are also lighter in build. Due to its longer rostrum, its third upper premolar lies almost in line with the others, rather than at an angle. Its dentition is well suited to an omnivorous diet. The long, curved canines have a sharp ridge on the posterior surface, and the outer incisors are canine-like. Its carnassials are smaller than those of the more carnivorous black-backed jackal. Females have four inguinal teats.

== Dietary habits ==
The side-striped jackal tends to be less carnivorous than other jackal species, and is a highly adaptable omnivore whose dietary preferences change in accordance to seasonal and local variation. It tends to forage solitarily, though family groups of up to 12 jackals have been observed to feed together in western Zimbabwe. In the wild, it feeds largely on invertebrates during the wet season and small mammals, such as the springhare, in the dry months. It frequently scavenges from campsites and the kills of larger predators. In the wild, fruit is taken exclusively in season, while in ruralised areas, it can account for 30% of their dietary intake. The side-striped jackal tends to be comparatively less predatory when compared to other jackal species. It typically does not target prey exceeding the size of neonatal antelopes, and one specimen was recorded to have entered a duck's pen to eat their feed, whilst ignoring the birds.

A side-striped jackal from Angola was found to be a host of an intestinal acanthocephalan worm, Pachysentis angolensis.

== Social behaviour and reproduction ==
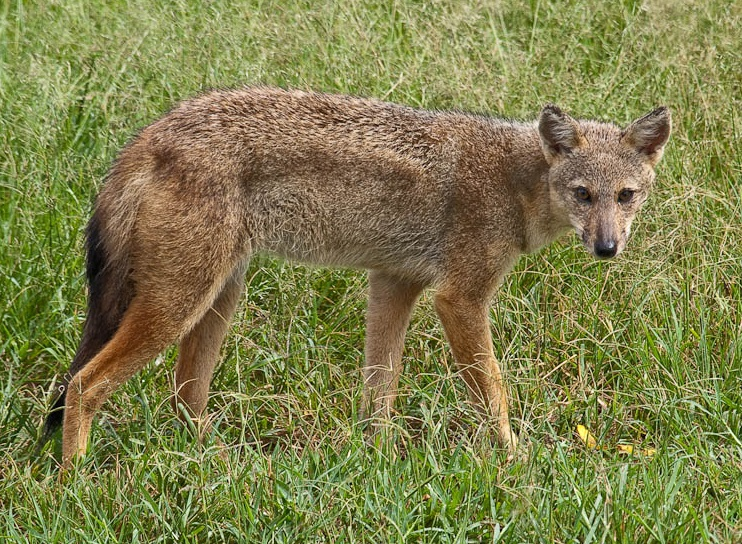
In Kidepo National Park, Uganda

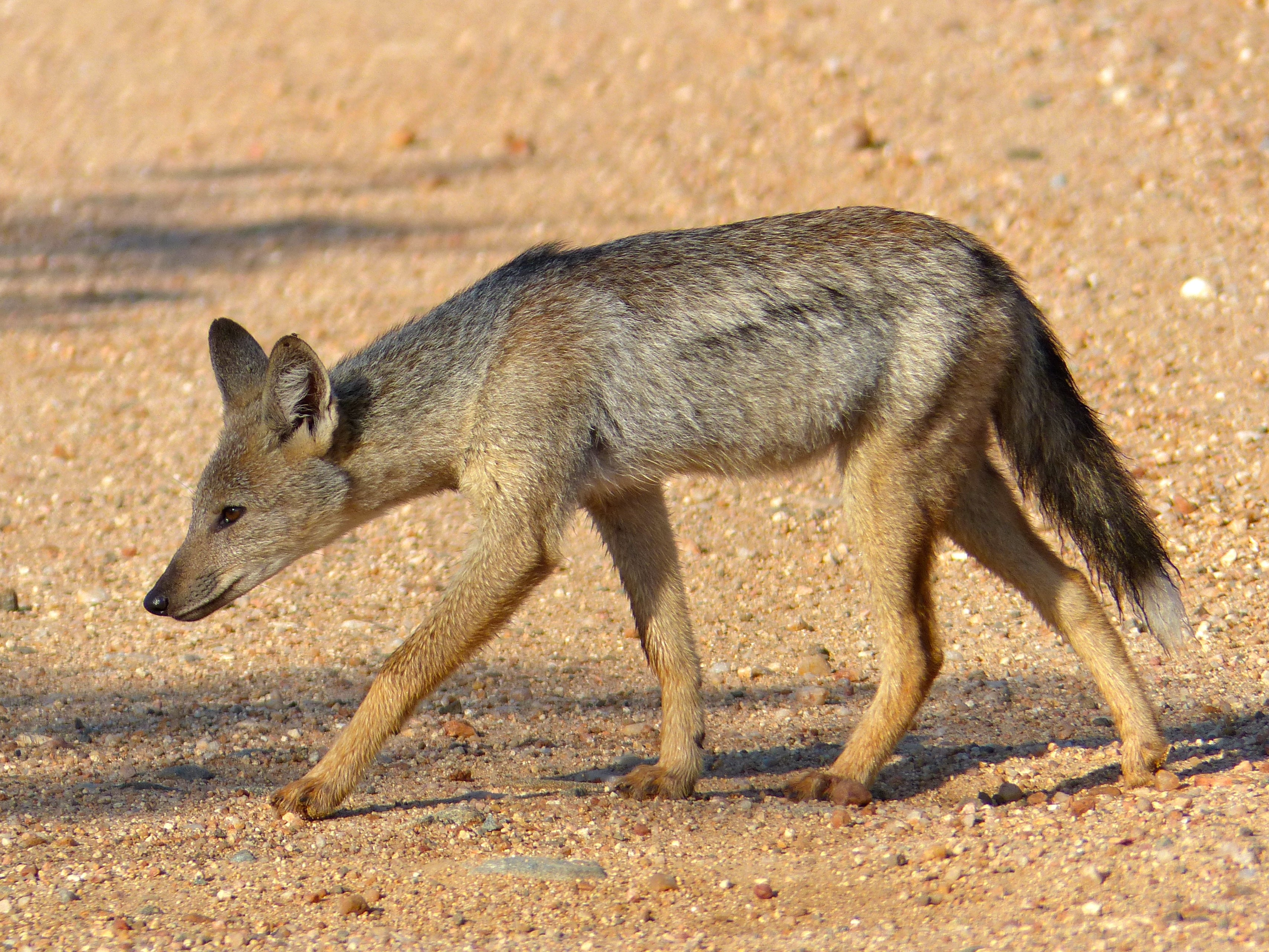
In Kruger National Park, South Africa

The side-striped jackal lives both solitarily and in family groups of up to seven individuals. The family unit is dominated by a breeding pair, which remains monogamous for a number of years.

The breeding season for this species depends on where they live; in Southern Africa, breeding starts in June and ends in November. The side-striped jackal has a gestation period of 57 to 70 days, with average litter of three to six young. The young reach sexual maturity at six to eight months of age, and typically begin to leave when 11 months old. The side-striped jackal is among the few mammal species that mate for life, forming monogamous pairs.

== Subspecies ==
There are seven recognized subspecies of the side-striped jackal:

- L. a. adusta (West Africa to most of Angola) – Sundevall's side-striped jackal
- L. a. bweha (East Africa; Kisumu, Kenya) – Elgon side-striped jackal
- L. a. centralis (Central Africa; Cameroon, near the Uham River)
- L. a. grayi (North Africa; Morocco and Tunisia)
- L. a. kaffensis (Kaffa, southwestern Ethiopia) – Kaffa side-striped jackal
- L. a. lateralis (East Africa; Kenya, Uasin Gishu Plateau, south of Gabon)
- L. a. notatus (East Africa; Kenya, Loita Plains, Rift Valley Province) – Loita side-striped jackal

== See also ==
- Wajee Nature Park
