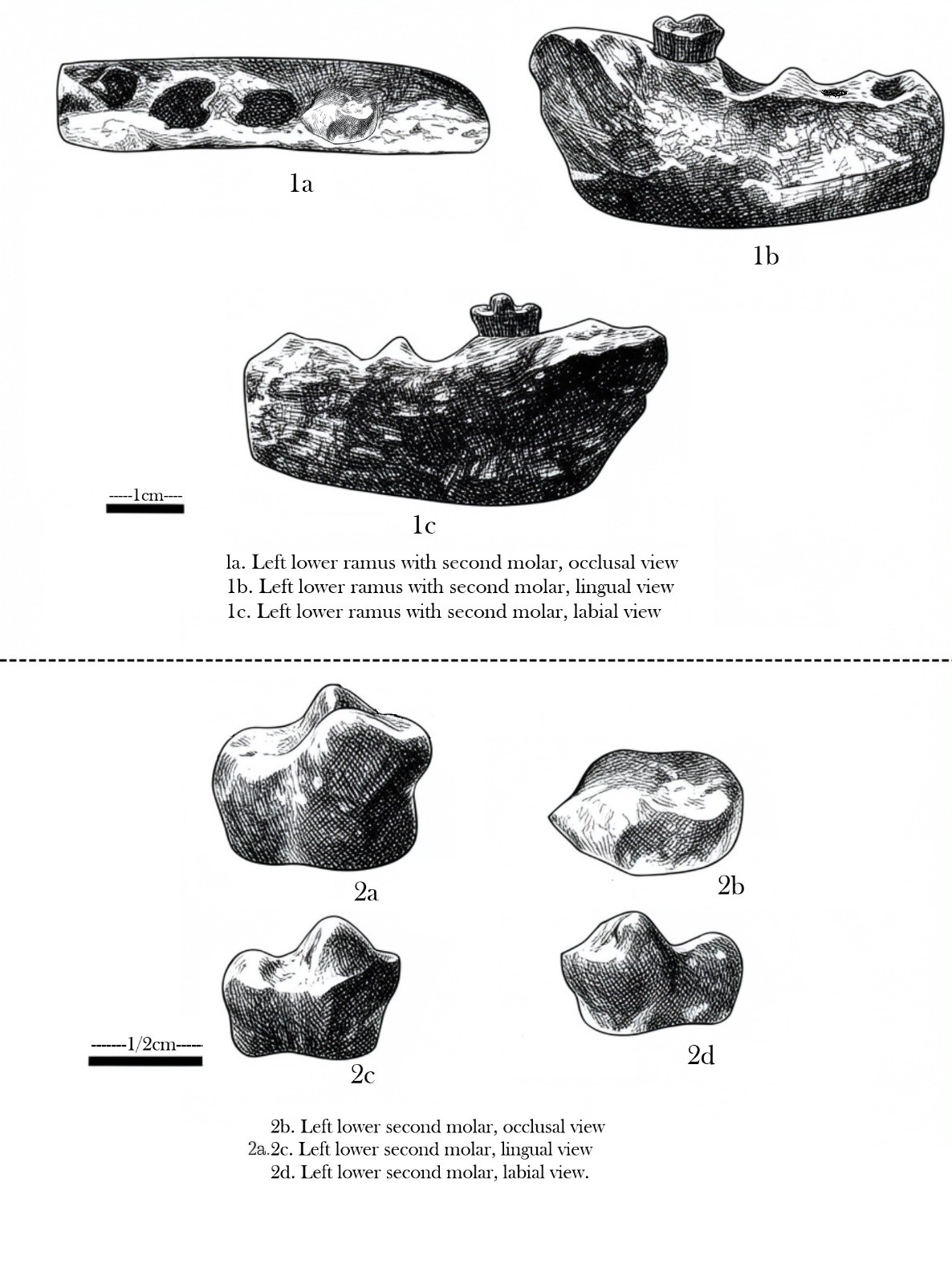
- Ramus and lower second molar of Canis vitastensis

Scientific classification
- Kingdom: Animalia
- Phylum: Chordata
- Class: Mammalia
- Infraclass: Placentalia
- Order: Carnivora
- Family: Canidae
- Genus: Canis
- Species: †C. vitastensis

Binomial name
- †Canis vitastensis Kotlia, 1987

= Canis vitastensis =

Extinct species of canine

Canis vitastensis was a species of wolf–like canid living in Plio-Pleistocene Kashmir. Its fossils were first discovered by B.S. Kotlia in Upper Karewa Formation.
