= Eucyon ferox =

Eucyon ferox Temporal range: ~4.95–4.8 Ma

Scientific classification
- Kingdom: Animalia
- Phylum: Chordata
- Class: Mammalia
- Order: Carnivora
- Family: Canidae
- Genus: †Eucyon
- Species: †E. ferox

Binomial name
- †Eucyon ferox (Miller and Carranza-Castaneda, 1998)

Synonyms
- Canis ferox Miller and Carranza-Castaneda, 1998

Extinct species of carnivore

Eucyon ferox is a species of canid which was endemic to North America and lived during the late Hemphillian age (between the Late Miocene and Early Pliocene). Originally described as a species of the extant genus Canis, this animal was thought to be an ancestor of the modern day coyote, but recent taxonomic revision has reassigned this species to the extinct genus Eucyon.

== Evolution ==
Eucyon ferox may have marked the beginning of the cladogenesis of the genus Canis. However, this species had other characteristics similar to Eucyon davisi, belonging to a different genus of canids. While E. ferox first lived in North America, the Late Miocene marked the start of its dispersal to Europe and Asia. The dispersal of canids and Eucyon does correlate to the increase in animal life and species richness in the area, but the diversity of the canid groups peaked at the same time as the turnover. In Asia, this peak was throughout the Pliocene Era.

== Morphological traits ==
The first partial fossil was found in Rancho Viejo, Guanajuato (Mexico). These fossils consisted of partial maxilla, mandible, vertebrae, shoulder blade, ulna, and phalanges, with nearly complete humeri and skull. Based on the found fossils, researchers estimated that this species was about the size of a female coyote but stronger and wider. It is estimated that their weight could be between 13.3 kg and 14.3 kg, based on the Legendre and Roth correlations. Paleontologists Miller and Carranza-Castaneda noted that the skull of this species resembled that of an ancestral coyote, Canis lepophagus.
