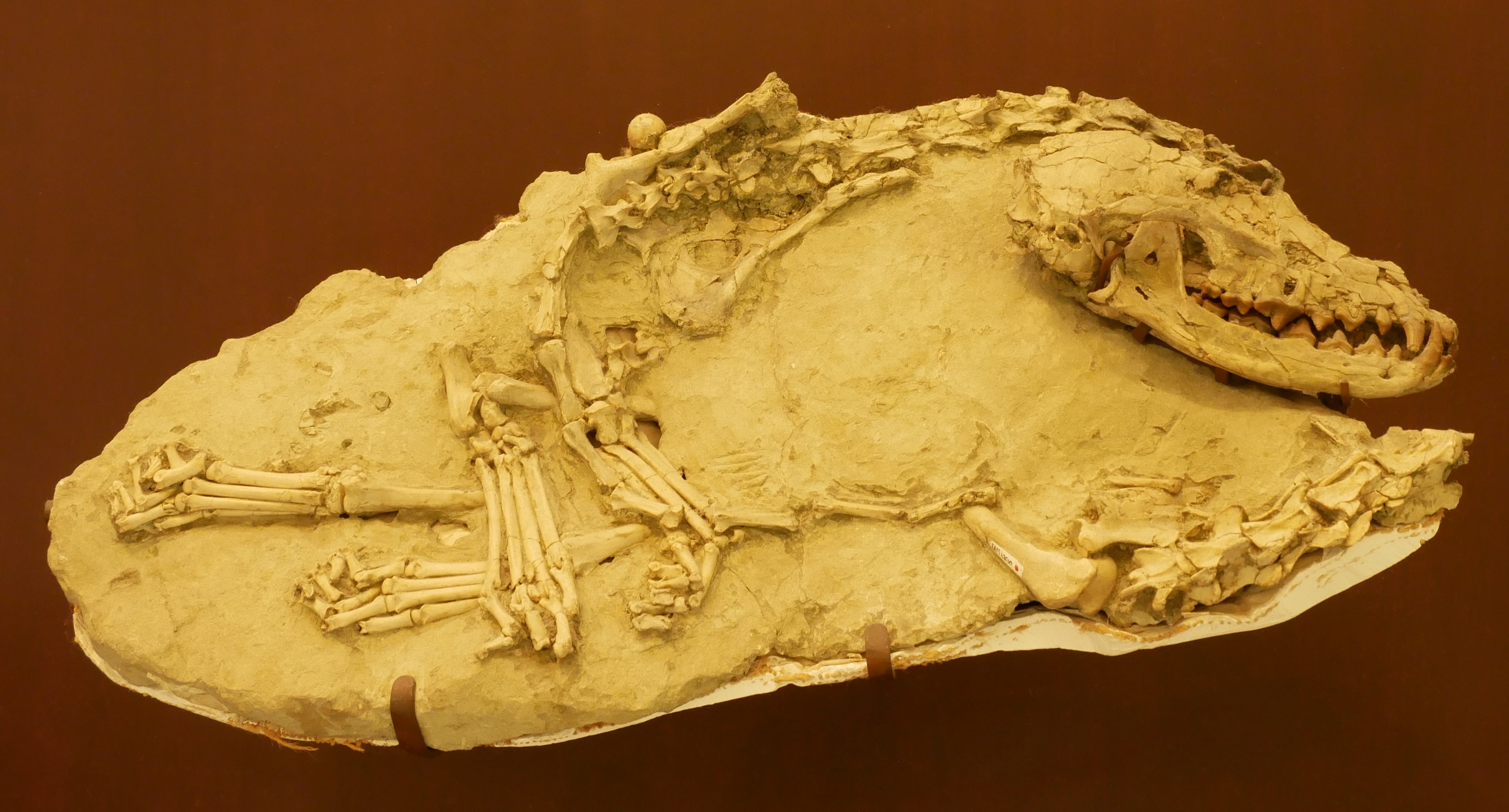
- Fossil skeleton of Eucyon davisi

Scientific classification
- Kingdom: Animalia
- Phylum: Chordata
- Class: Mammalia
- Order: Carnivora
- Family: Canidae
- Subfamily: Caninae
- Genus: †Eucyon; Tedford and Qiu (1996)

Type species
- †Eucyon davisi (Merriam, 1911) [originally Canis]

Species
- †E. davisi; †E. ferox; †E. intrepidus; †E. khoikhoi; †E. kuta; †E. marinae; †E. minor; †E. monticinensis; †E. skinneri; †E. wokari; †E. zhoui

= Eucyon =

Eucyon Temporal range: Late Miocene–Late Pliocene, 10.3–3.6 Ma

Extinct genus of carnivores

Eucyon (Greek: εὖ eu: good, true; κῠ́ων cyon: dog) is an extinct genus of medium-sized omnivorous coyote-like canid that first appeared in the Western United States during the late Middle Miocene 10 million years ago. It was the size of a jackal and weighed around 15 kg. It was one of the few North American mammals which invaded Eurasia about 6 million years ago, followed by the genus going extinct 3 million years ago. This genus is proposed to have given rise to genus Canis 6 million years ago.

== Taxonomy ==
Eucyon was named by Tedford and Qiu in 1996. Phyletically it stood between Canis and the South American canines that would follow it. In 2009, Tedford revised its diagnosis and described two of its species, E. skinneri and E. davisi, which was originally named Canis davisi by Merriam in 1911. Numerous species were previously described as Canis, including Eucyon ferox. Because of the high morphological similarity of E. debonisi to the species E. monticinensis, the former taxon is now regarded to be a junior synonym of the latter.

=== Eucyon davisi ===
The jackal-sized Eucyon existed in North America from 10 million YBP until the Early Pliocene. Wang and Tedford proposed that the genus Canis was the descendant of the coyote-like Eucyon davisi, remains of which first appeared in the Miocene (6 million YBP) in the southwestern U.S. and Mexico. By the Pliocene (5 million YBP), the larger Canis lepophagus appeared in the same region and by the Early Pleistocene (1 million YBP) Canis latrans (the coyote) was in existence. They proposed that the progression from Eucyon davisi to C. lepophagus to the coyote was linear evolution.

=== Eucyon khoikhoi ===
The recent discovery of the 5 million years old E. khoikhoi supports the proposed radiation of the genus Eucyon, with the oldest E. ferox in North America, to E. davisi in North America then to China, to E. debonisi in Western Europe, to E. khoikhoi in Africa.

== Description ==
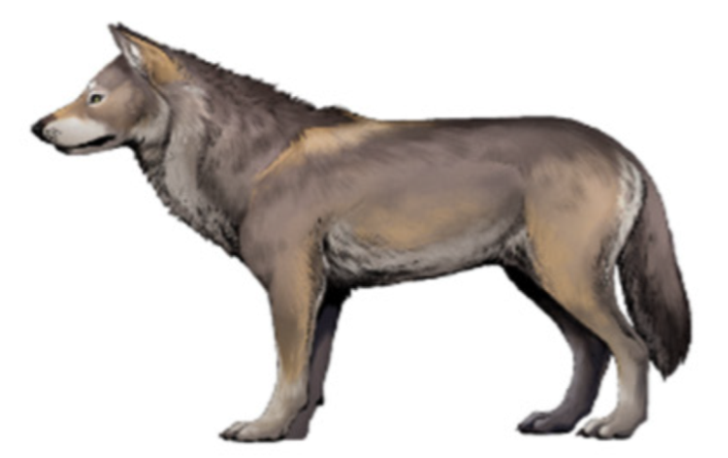
Restoration

A medium canid - it is the size of a jackal, weighing around 15 kg (33 lb).

== Fossil distribution ==
The fossil remains are found in the Rio Grande, Texas to western Oregon and Washington's Ringold Formation, as well as northern Nebraska, along with Greece, Ethiopia, Mongolia and many other locations across the Old World.

== Palaeobiology ==
=== Palaeopathology ===
A palaeopathological specimen of E. khoikhoi from Langebaanweg has been found containing evidence of multiple exostoses, one of which was diagnosed as an osteochondroma.
