= Pleistocene wolf =

Extinct lineage of the grey wolf

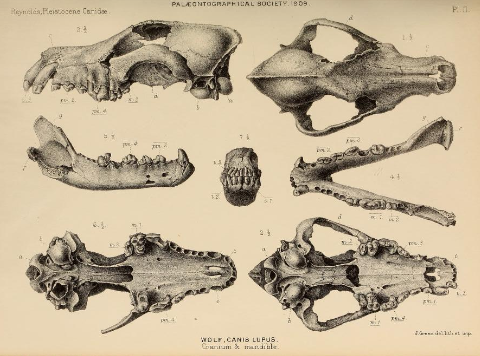
Lithograph of Pleistocene wolf remains from Britain

During the Pleistocene, wolves were widely distributed across the Northern Hemisphere. Some Pleistocene wolves, such as Beringian wolves and those from Japan, exhibited large body size in comparison to modern gray wolf populations. Genetic analysis of the remains of Late Pleistocene wolves suggest that across their range populations of wolves maintained considerable gene flow between each other and thus there was limited genetic divergence between them. Modern wolves mostly draw their ancestry from some Siberian populations of Late Pleistocene gray wolves, which largely replaced other gray wolf populations after the Last Glacial Maximum.

== Taxonomy ==
Pleistocene wolves represent a distinct ecomorph of Canis lupus. The ancient wolf specimens from Europe have been classified as Canis lupus spelaeus Goldfuß, 1823 – the cave wolf.

== Biogeography ==
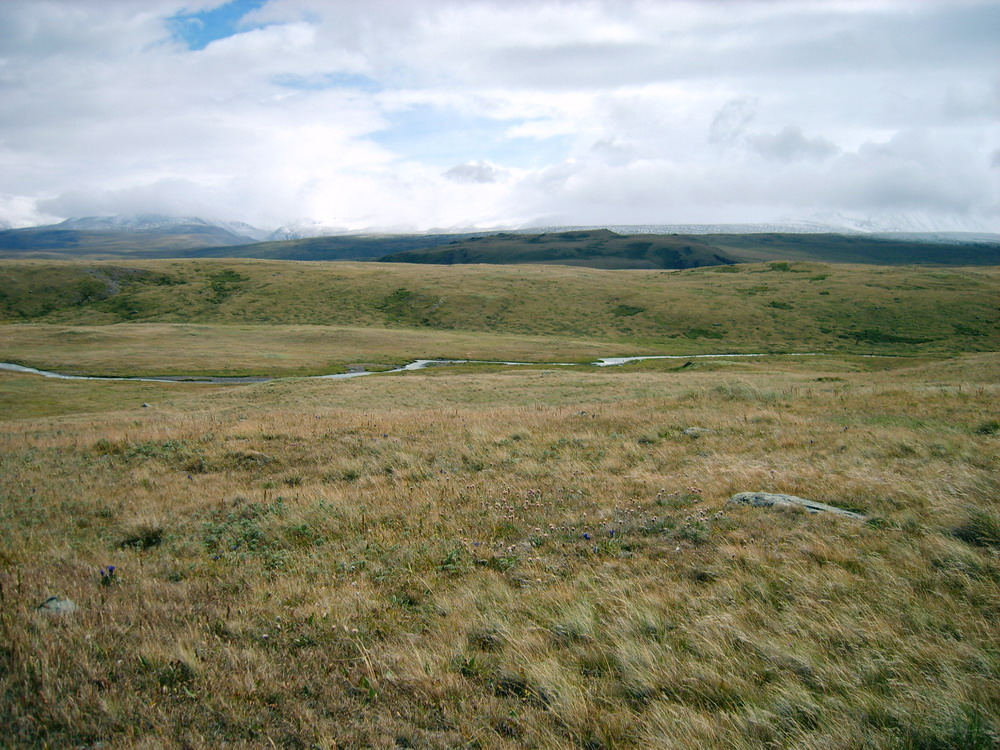
Ukok Plateau, one of the last remnants of the mammoth steppe

The Late Pleistocene era was a time of glaciation, climate change, and the advance of humans into isolated areas. During the Late Pleistocene glaciation, a vast mammoth steppe stretched from Spain eastwards across Eurasia and over Beringia into Alaska and the Yukon. The close of this era was characterized by a series of severe and rapid climate oscillations with regional temperature changes of up to 16 °C (29 °F), which has been correlated with megafaunal extinctions. There is no evidence of megafaunal extinctions at the height of the Last Glacial Maximum (26,500 YBP), indicating that increasing cold and glaciation were not factors. Multiple events appear to have caused the rapid replacement of one species by another one within the same genus, or one population by another within the same species, across a broad area. As some species became extinct, so too did the predators that depended on them (coextinction).

Ecological factors including habitat type, climate, prey specialization, and predatory competition will greatly influence grey wolf genetic population structure and cranio-dental plasticity. Therefore, within the Pleistocene wolf population, the variations between local environments would have encouraged a range of wolf ecotypes that were genetically, morphologically, and ecologically distinct from one another. The origin of the modern grey wolf is nested in the biogeography of wolf populations that lived during the Late Pleistocene. The grey wolf is one of the few large carnivores to survive the Late Pleistocene megafaunal extinctions, but similar to many other megafaunal species it experienced a global population decline towards the end of this era, which was associated with extinctions of ecomorphs and phylogeographic shifts in populations.

== Genetics ==
Phylogenetic tree for Canis lupus with timing in years (Note: For a full set of supporting references refer to the note (a) in the phylotree at Evolution of the wolf#Wolf-like canids)

- 250,000
  - 120,000
    - 80,000
      - 31,000
        - Dog
        - Holarctic grey wolf
      - Late Pleistocene wolf†
    - Indian plains wolf
  - Himalayan wolf

A haplotype (haploid genotype) is a group of genes in an organism that are inherited together from a single parent. A haplogroup is a group of similar haplotypes that share a common ancestor with a single-nucleotide polymorphism (a mutation). Mitochondrial DNA passes along a maternal lineage that can date back thousands of years.

In 2010, a study compared DNA sequences that were 230 base pairs in length from the mitochondrial control region of 24 ancient wolf specimens from western Europe dated between 44,000–1,200 YBP with those of modern grey wolves. Most of the sequences could be represented on a phylogenetic tree. However, the haplotypes of the Himalayan wolf and the Indian grey wolf could not because they were 8 mutations apart from the other wolves, indicating distinct lineages which had previously been found in other studies. The study found that there were 75 different grey wolf mDNA haplotypes that include 23 in Europe, 30 in Asia, 18 in North America, 3 in both Europe and Asia, and 1 in both Europe and North America. These haplotypes could be allocated into two haplogroups that were separated from each other by 5 mutations. Haplogroup 1 formed a monophyletic clade (indicating that they all carried the same mutation inherited from a single female ancestor). All other haplotypes were basal in the tree, and these formed 2–3 smaller clades that were assigned to haplogroup 2 that was not monophyletic.

Haplogroups 1 and 2 could be found spread across Eurasia but only haplogroup 1 could be found in North America. The ancient wolf samples from western Europe differed from modern wolves by 1 to 10 mutations, and all belonged to haplogroup 2 indicating a haplogroup 2 predominance in this region for over 40,000 years before and after the Last Glacial Maximum. A comparison of current and past frequencies indicated that in Europe haplogroup 2 became outnumbered by haplogroup 1 over the past several thousand years but in North America haplogroup 2 became extinct and was replaced by haplogroup 1 after the Last Glacial Maximum. Access into North America was available between 20,000–11,000 years ago after the Wisconsin glaciation had retreated but before the Bering land bridge became inundated by the sea. Therefore, haplogroup 1 was able to enter into North America during this period.

Stable isotope analysis conducted on the bone of a specimen allows researchers to form conclusions about the diet, and therefore the ecology, of extinct wolf populations. This analysis suggests that the Pleistocene wolves from haplogroup 2 found in Beringia and Belgium preyed mainly on Pleistocene megafauna, which became rare at the beginning of the Holocene 12,000 years ago. One study found the Beringian wolf to be basal to all other grey wolves except for the extant Indian grey wolf and the extant Himalayan wolf. The Pleistocene Eurasian wolves have been found to be morphologically and genetically comparable to the Pleistocene eastern-Beringian wolves, with some of the ancient European and Beringian wolves sharing a common haplotype (a17), which makes ecological similarity likely. Two ancient wolves from Ukraine dated around 30,000 YBP and the 33,000 YBP "Altai dog" had the same sequence as six Beringian wolves, and another from the Czech Republic dated 44,000 YBP had the same sequence as two Beringian wolves.

It has been proposed that the Pleistocene wolves across northern Eurasia and northern North America represented a continuous and almost panmictic population that was genetically and probably also ecologically distinct from the wolves living in this area today. The specialized Pleistocene wolves did not contribute to the genetic diversity of modern wolves, and the modern wolf populations across the Holarctic are likely to be the descendants of wolves from populations that came from more southern refuges. Extant haplogroup 2 wolves can be found in Italy, the Balkans and the Carpathian Mountains but rare elsewhere in Europe. In Asia, only four haplotypes have been identified as belonging to this haplogroup, and two of them occur in the Middle East. Haplogroup 2 did not become extinct in Europe, and if before the Last Glacial Maximum haplogroup 2 was exclusively associated with the wolf ecomorph specialized in preying on megafauna, it would mean that in Europe it was capable of adapting to changing prey.

In 2013, a mitochondrial DNA sequencing of ancient wolf-like canids revealed another separate lineage of 3 haplotypes (forming a haplogroup) that was found in 3 Late Pleistocene specimens from Belgium; however, it has not been detected in extant wolves.

One of these was the "Goyet dog".

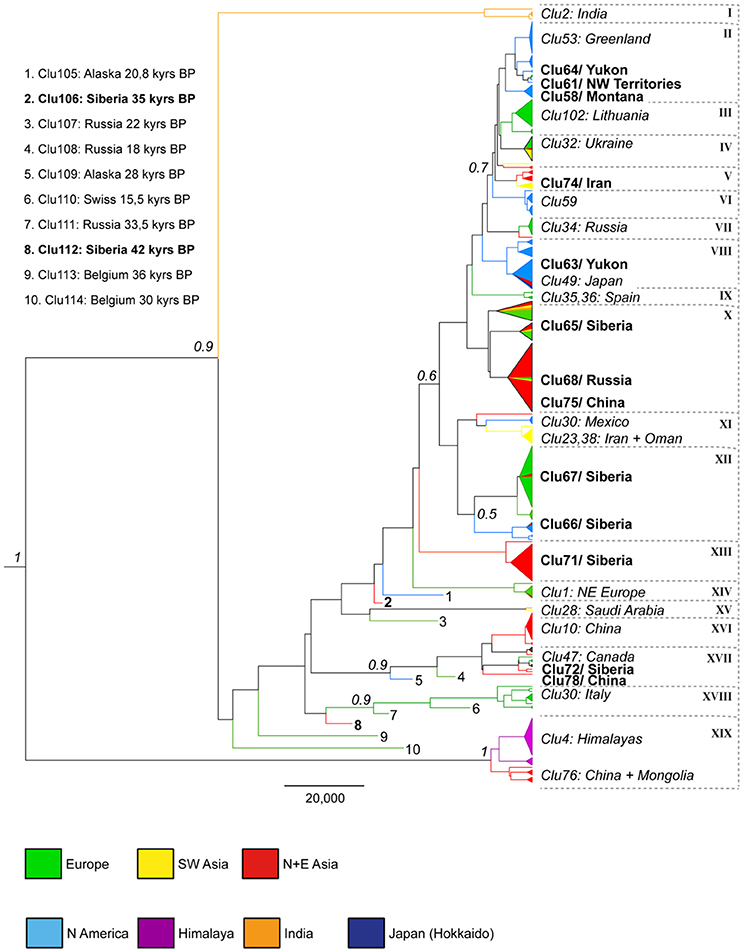
mDNA phylogenetic tree for wolves. Clades are denoted I–XIX. Key regions/haplotypes are indicated and new haplotypes are displayed in bold. Late Pleistocene samples are represented by the numbers 1–10. Beringian wolf (Alaska 28,000 YBP) haplotype found in the modern clade XVI from China.

In 2016, a study was undertaken due to concerns that previous mDNA studies may have been conducted with insufficient genetic resolution or limited geographical coverage and had not included sufficient specimens from Russia, China, and the Middle East. The study compared a 582 base pair sequence of the mitochondrial control region which gave twice the phylogenetic resolution of the 2010 study. The study compared the sequences of both modern wolves and ancient wolf specimens, including specimens from the remote areas of North America, Russia and China. The study included the Taimyr wolves, the Goyet "dog", the Altai "dog", Beringian wolves, and other ancient specimens.

The study found 114 different wolf haplotypes among 314 sequences, with the new haplotypes being found in Siberia and China. The phylogenetic tree resolved into 19 clades that included both modern and ancient wolves, which showed that the most basal clades included the Indian grey wolf and the Himalayan wolf, with a subclade of wolves from China and Mongolia falling within the Himalayan wolf clade. The two most basal North American haplotypes included the Mexican wolf and the Vancouver Island wolf; however, the Vancouver Island wolf showed the same haplotype as a dog which indicates admixture, with the dog lineage basal to all extant North American subspecies. In Europe, the two most genetically distinct haplotypes form the Iberian wolf and separately the Italian wolf that was positioned close to the ancient wolves. The Greenland wolves all belonged to one haplotype that had been previously found among North American wolves and which indicates their origin from North America. The Eastern wolf was confirmed as a coyote/wolf hybrid. Wolves found in the regions of the Chukotka Peninsula, the North Korean border, Amur Oblast and Khakassia showed the greatest genetic diversity and with close links to all other wolves found across the holarctic. One ancient haplotype that had been found in Alaska (Eastern Beringia 28,000 YBP) and Russia (Medvezya "Bear" Cave, Pechora area, Northern Urals 18,000 YBP) was shared with some modern wolves found in China and Mongolia.

The previous finding of two wolf haplogroups was not clearly delineated in this study but it agreed that the genetic diversity of past wolves has been lost at the beginning of the Holocene in Alaska, Siberia, and Europe with limited overlap with modern wolves. For the ancient wolves of North America, instead of an extinction/replacement model suggested by a previous study, this study found substantial evidence of a population bottleneck in North America in which the ancient wolf diversity was almost lost around the beginning of the Holocene (no further elaboration in the study). In Eurasia, the loss of ancient lineages could not be simply explained and appears to have been slow across time with the reasons unclear.

A 2022 study suggested that there was relatively little genetic difference between Pleistocene wolf populations even prior to the Last Glacial Maximum expansion of Siberian wolves replacing other wolf populations due to high connectivity across their range, and that a small amount of local pre-LGM European wolf ancestry persisted in modern European wolves.

Genetic studies of Pleistocene-aged wolves from Siberia indicates that they did not form a monophyletic group to exclusion of modern wolves, but instead represented various offshoots from the modern wolves.

== Description ==
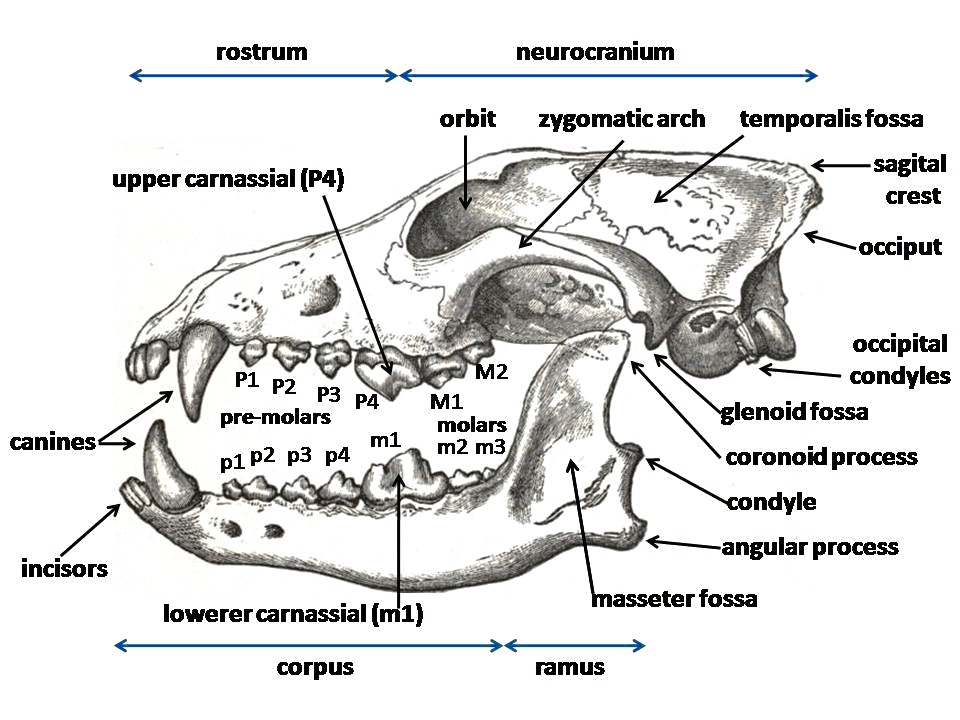
Diagram of a wolf skull with key features labelled

The fossil record shows evidence of changes in the morphology and body size of wolves during the Late Pleistocene, which may be due to differences in their prey size. Wolf skeletal development can be changed due to a preference for larger prey which results in larger wolves. Considerable morphological diversity existed among grey wolves by the Late Pleistocene. These are regarded as having been more cranio-dentally robust than modern grey wolves, often with a shortened rostrum, the pronounced development of the temporalis muscle, and robust premolars. It is proposed that these features were specialized adaptations for the processing of carcass and bone associated with the hunting and scavenging of Pleistocene megafauna. Compared with modern wolves, some Pleistocene wolves showed an increase in tooth breakage that is similar to that seen in the extinct dire wolf. This suggests that these either often processed carcasses, or that they competed with other carnivores and needed to quickly consume their prey. The frequency and location of tooth fractures found in these wolves compared with the modern spotted hyena indicates that these wolves were habitual bone crackers.

Late Pleistocene wolves were similar in physical size to a large extant grey wolves, but with stronger jaws and teeth. They tended to have short, broad palates with large carnassials relative to their overall skull size. These features suggest a wolf adapted for producing relatively large bite forces. The short, broad rostrum increased the mechanical advantage of a bite made with the canine teeth and strengthened the skull against torsional stresses caused by struggling prey. Relatively deep jaws are characteristic of habitual bone crackers, such as spotted hyenas, as well as canids that take prey as large as or larger than themselves. Overall, these features indicate that megafaunal wolves were more specialized than modern grey wolves in killing and consuming relatively large prey, and scavenging.

In comparison to modern grey wolves, Late Pleistocene wolf samples include many more individuals with moderately to heavily worn teeth, and significantly greater numbers of broken teeth. The distribution of fractures across the tooth row differs as well, with these wolves having much higher fracture frequencies of incisors, carnassials, and molars. A similar pattern was observed in spotted hyenas, suggesting that increased incisor and carnassial fracture reflects habitual bone consumption, because bones are gnawed with incisors and subsequently cracked with the cheek teeth.

In 2009, a study of the fossil remains of "Paleolithic dogs" and Pleistocene wolves found that five wolf specimens from Trou Baileux, Belgium, Trou des Nutons, Belgium, Mezine, Ukraine, and Yakutia, Siberia had a greater snout width than recent wolves. A similar trend was discovered in the North American fossil East Beringian wolf.

In 2014, a study of the morphology of wolf remains from Europe dating from the Middle-Late Pleistocene and Holocene indicated that the size of the lower carnassial teeth did not fluctuate directly with changes in climate but possibly with the spread of cold megafauna, and therefore in the dietary regime. The lower carnassial length can be used to estimate carnivore body size.

In 2015, a study looked at specimens of all of the carnivore species from Rancho La Brea, California, including remains of the large canine Aenocyon dirus, that was also a megafaunal hypercarnivore. The evidence suggests that these carnivores were not food-stressed just before extinction, and that carcass use was less than among large carnivores today. The high incidence of tooth breakage likely resulted from the acquisition and consumption of larger prey.

=== Coat colour ===
Domestic dogs exhibit diverse coat colours and patterns. In many mammals, different colour patterns are the result of the regulation of the Agouti gene, which can cause hair follicles to switch from making black or brown pigments to yellow or nearly white pigments. The most common coat pattern found in modern wolves is agouti, in which the upperside of the body has banded hairs and the underside exhibits lighter shading. The colour yellow is dominant to the colour black and is found in dogs across much of the world and the dingo in Australia.

In 2021, a study of whole genome sequences taken from dogs and wolves focused on the genetic relationships between them based on coat colour. The study found that most dog colour haplotypes were similar to most wolf haplotypes, however dominant yellow in dogs was closely related to white in arctic wolves from North America. This result suggests a common origin for dominant yellow in dogs and white in wolves but without recent gene flow, because this clade was found to be basal to the golden jackal and genetically distinct from all other canids. The most recent common ancestor of the golden jackal and the wolf lineage dates back to 2 million YBP. The study proposes that 35,000 YBP there was genetic introgression into the Late Pleistocene grey wolf from a ghost population of an extinct canid which had diverged from the grey wolf lineage over 2 million YBP. This colour diversity could be found 35,000 YBP in wolves and 9,500 YBP in dogs. A closely related haplotype exists among those wolves of Tibet which possess yellow shading in their coats. The study explains the colour relationships between modern dogs and wolves, white wolves from North America, yellow dogs, and yellowish wolves from Tibet. The study concludes that during the Late Pleistocene, natural selection laid the genetic foundation for modern coat colour diversity in dogs and wolves.

== Diet ==
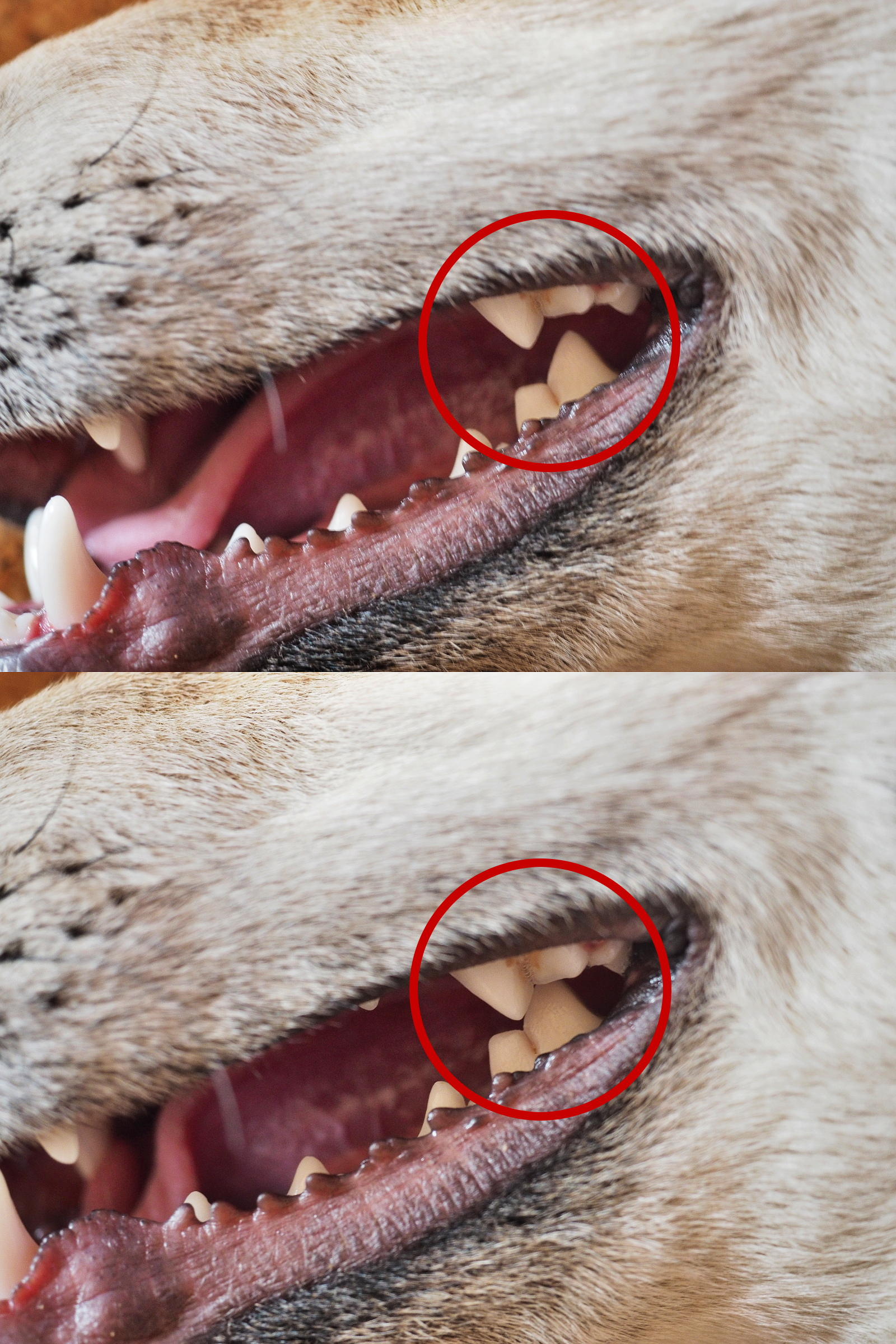
Location of a dog's carnassials; the inside of the 4th upper premolar aligns with the outside of the 1st lower molar, working like scissor blades

Isotopic bone collagen analysis of the specimens indicated that Pleistocene wolves ate horse, bison, woodland muskox, and mammoth — i.e., Pleistocene megafauna. This supports the conclusion that they were capable of killing and dismembering large prey. Compared with the extant grey wolves, the Pleistocene wolf was hypercarnivorous, with a craniodental morphology more capable of capturing, dismembering, and consuming the bones of very large mega-herbivores. When their prey disappeared, this wolf did as well, resulting in a significant loss of phenotypic and genetic diversity within the species.

== Habitat ==
Based on the morphological and genetic evidence, Wolves were distributed across the northern Holarctic during the Late Pleistocene.

=== Paleoecology ===
The last glacial period, commonly referred to as the "Ice Age", spanned 125,000 to 14,500 years ago and was the most recent glacial period within the current ice age which occurred during the last years of the Pleistocene era. The Ice Age reached its peak during the Last Glacial Maximum, when ice sheets commenced advancing from 33,000 years BP and reached their maximum positions 26,500 years BP. Deglaciation commenced in the Northern Hemisphere approximately 19,000 years BP, and in Antarctica approximately 14,500 years BC, which is consistent with evidence that this was the primary source for an abrupt rise in the sea level 14,500 years ago.

A vast mammoth steppe stretched from Spain across Eurasia and over the Bering land bridge into Alaska and the Yukon, where it was stopped by the Wisconsin glaciation. This land bridge existed because more of the planet's water was locked up in glaciation than now, and therefore the sea levels were lower. When the sea levels began to rise, this bridge was inundated around 11,000 years BC. During the Last Glacial Maximum, the continent of Europe was much colder and drier than it is today, with polar desert in the north and the remainder steppe or tundra. Forest and woodland was almost non-existent, except for isolated pockets in the mountain ranges of southern Europe. The fossil evidence from many continents points to the extinction mainly of large animals at or near the end of the last glaciation. These animals have been termed Pleistocene megafauna.

=== Beringia ===
Shrinking of the Bering land bridge

Beringia is a loosely defined region surrounding the Bering Strait, the Chukchi Sea, and the Bering Sea. It includes parts of Chukotka and Kamchatka in Russia, as well as Alaska in the United States. In historical contexts it also includes the Bering land bridge, an ancient land bridge roughly 1,600 kilometres (1,000 mi) wide (north to south) at its greatest extent, which connected Asia with North America at various times – all lying atop the existing North American Plate, and east of the Siberian Chersky Range — during the Pleistocene ice ages. During ice ages, more water was stored as ice, the sea levels fell, and a land bridge was exposed.

==== East Beringia ====
Dentition of an Ice Age wolf showing functions of the teeth.

In 2007, a study was undertaken on the skeletal material from 56 Pleistocene-period East Beringian wolves from permafrost deposits in Alaska. Uncalibrated radio carbon dating showed a continuous population from 45,500 years BP to 12,500 years BP, and one single wolf dated at 7,600 BP. This indicates that their population was in decline after 12,500 BP. Megafauna was still available in this region until 10,500 BP, with the age of the more recent wolf specimen supported by the discovery of a remaining pocket of residual megafauna that still inhabited interior Alaska between 7,500–10,500 BP.

The East Beringian wolf was identified as an ecomorph of the grey wolf (Canis lupus) with a skull morphology that was adapted for hunting and scavenging megafauna. None of the 16 mtDNA haplotypes recovered from a sample of 20 of the wolves was shared with any modern grey wolf, but similar haplotypes were found in Late Pleistocene Eurasian grey wolves. Six eastern-Beringian wolves had the same sequence found in two wolves from Ukraine dated 30,000 years BP and 28,000 years BP, and from Altai dated 33,000 years BP. Two eastern-Beringian wolves matched another haplotype with a wolf from the Czech Republic dated at 44,000 years BP. Its phylogeny indicates that, aside from the older-lineage Himalayan wolf and the Indian grey wolf, the Beringian wolf's unique haplotypes are basal to other grey wolves. Its genetic diversity was higher than that of its modern counterparts, implying that the wolf population of the Late Pleistocene was larger than the present population. Modern North American wolves are not their descendants, and this supports the existence of a separate origin for ancient and extant North American wolves.

A more detailed analysis of the genetic material from three specimens were dated at 28,000 years BP, 21,000 years BP, and 20,800 years BP, respectively (with the samples deposited in GenBank with accession numbers KF661088, KF661089 and KF661090) and identified as Canis lupus.

As of 2020, the oldest known intact wolf remains belongs to a mummified pup dated 56,000 YBP that was recovered from the permafrost along a small tributary of Last Chance Creek near Dawson City, Yukon, Canada. A DNA analysis showed that it belonged to the Beringian wolf clade, that the most recent common ancestor of this clade dates to 86,700–67,500 YBP, and that this clade was basal to all other wolves except for the Himalayan wolf.

==== West Beringia ====
In 2009, a study was made on a skull fragment and right mandible of a wolf (Canis lupus) found near Lake Taimyr in the Taimyr Peninsula, Arctic Siberia, Russian Federation (the Lake Taimyr wolf). It is one of the northernmost records of Pleistocene carnivora in Eurasia. The skull was aged by radio carbon dating to 16,220 BP.

The adult skull was small and assumed to be a female, as it did not differ in size to an extant female wolf skull from northern Siberia. Another study of the Lake Taimyr wolf found that its comparatively small size and characters of the cheekteeth and skull raised the possibility that it might have been a domesticated or semi-domesticated animal.

The increased skull width in comparison to extant wolves indicated pronounced development of the temporalis muscles. The specimens were compared to wolf (Canis lupus spelaeus) fossils found near Burnberg, Germany, and near the Paleolithic site of Kostenki 1 on the Don River near Voronezh, Russia. Both of the European fossil skulls demonstrated the same dentition as the fossil wolf from Taimyr. The skull and teeth arrangement suggest a considerable portion of carrion and bones in the diet. In the severe environmental conditions of the Late Pleistocene arctic zone of Eurasia, carrion had been one of the principal food sources for these animals. "Notably, the Pleistocene C. lupus from eastern Beringia, by the skull shape, tooth wear and isotopic data, is also reconstructed as a specialized hunter and scavenger of extinct North American megafauna."

In 2019, the severed head of the world's first full-sized Pleistocene wolf was unearthed in the Abyisky district in the north of Yakutia. The wolf, whose rich mammoth-like fur and impressive fangs are still intact, was fully grown and aged from two to four years old when it died. 'This is a unique discovery of the first ever remains of a fully grown Pleistocene wolf with its tissue preserved. We will be comparing it to modern-day wolves to understand how the species has evolved and to reconstruct its appearance,' said an excited Albert Protopopov, from the Republic of Sakha Academy of Sciences.

=== Arctic Siberia ===
==== Taimyr wolf ====
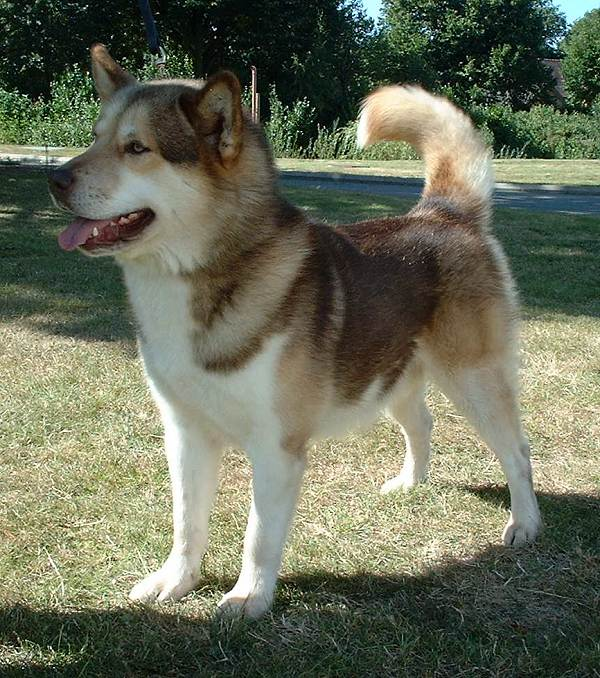
The Greenland Dog carries 3.5% shared genetic material (and perhaps up to 27%) with the extinct 35,000 YBP Taimyr wolf

In May 2015 a study was conducted on a partial rib-bone of a wolf specimen (named "Taimyr-1") found near the Bolshaya Balakhnaya River in the Taimyr Peninsula of Arctic North Asia, that was AMS radiocarbon dated to 34,900 YBP. The sample provided the first draft genome of the cell nucleus for a Pleistocene carnivore, and the sequence was identified as belonging to Canis lupus.

Using the Taimyr-1 specimen's radiocarbon date, its genome sequence and that of a modern wolf, a direct estimate of the genome-wide mutation rate in dogs / wolves could be made to calculate the time of divergence. The data indicated that the previously unknown Taimyr-1 lineage was a wolf population separate to modern wolves and dogs and indicated that the Taimyr-1 genotype, grey wolves and dogs diverged from a now-extinct common ancestor before the peak of the Last Glacial Maximum, 27,000–40,000 years ago. The separation of the dog and wolf did not have to coincide with selective breeding by humans. Such an early divergence is consistent with several paleontological reports of dog-like canids dated up to 36,000 YBP, as well as evidence that domesticated dogs most likely accompanied early colonizers into the Americas.

Comparison to the grey wolf lineage indicated that Taimyr-1 was basal to grey wolves from the Middle East, China, Europe and North America but shared a substantial amount of history with the present-day grey wolves after their divergence from the coyote. This implies that the ancestry of the majority of grey wolf populations today stems from an ancestral population that lived less than 35,000 years ago but before the inundation of the Bering Land Bridge with the subsequent isolation of Eurasian and North American wolves.

A comparison of the ancestry of the Taimyr-1 lineage to the dog lineage indicated that some modern dog breeds have a closer association with either the grey wolf or Taimyr-1 due to admixture. The Saarloos wolfdog showed more association with the grey wolf, which is in agreement with the documented historical crossbreeding with grey wolves in this breed. Taimyr-1 shared more alleles (gene expressions) with those breeds that are associated with high latitudes: the Siberian Husky and Greenland Dog that are also associated with arctic human populations, and to a lesser extent the Shar Pei and Finnish Spitz. An admixture graph of the Greenland Dog indicates a best-fit of 3.5% shared material, although an ancestry proportion ranging between 1.4% and 27.3% is consistent with the data. This indicates admixture between the Taimyr-1 population and the ancestral dog population of these four high-latitude breeds. These results can be explained either by a very early presence of dogs in northern Eurasia or by the genetic legacy of Taimyr-1 being preserved in northern wolf populations until the arrival of dogs at high latitudes. This introgression could have provided early dogs living in high latitudes with phenotypic variation beneficial for adaption to a new and challenging environment. It also indicates that the ancestry of present-day dog breeds descends from more than one region.

An attempt to explore admixture between Taimyr-1 and grey wolves produced unreliable results.

As the Taimyr wolf had contributed to the genetic makeup of the Arctic breeds, a later study suggested that descendants of the Taimyr wolf survived until dogs were domesticated in Europe and arrived at high latitudes where they mixed with local wolves, and these both contributed to the modern Arctic breeds. Based on the most widely accepted oldest zooarchaeological dog remains, domestic dogs most likely arrived at high latitudes within the last 15,000 years. The mutation rates calibrated from both the Taimyr wolf and the Newgrange dog genomes suggest that modern wolf and dog populations diverged from a common ancestor between 20,000–60,000 YBP. This indicates that either dogs were domesticated much earlier than their first appearance in the archaeological record, or they arrived in the Arctic early, or both.

The finding of a second wolf specimen from the same area ("Taimry-2") and dated to 42,000 YBP has also been sequenced but yielded only mitochondrial DNA.

In 2021, a 44,000 year-old mummified wolf specimen was discovered in the permafrost of Russia's northeastern Yakutia region.

=== Europe ===
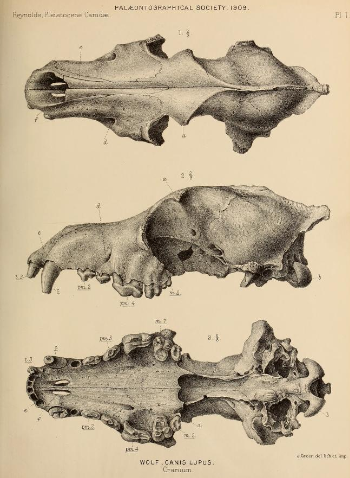
Illustration of a Pleistocene wolf cranium that was found in Kents Cavern, Torquay, England

==== Canis lupus spelaeus ====
The European cave wolf (Canis lupus spelaeus) was first described by Georg August Goldfuß in 1823 based on a wolf pup skull found in the Zoolithen Cave located at Gailenreuth, Bavaria, Germany. The wolf possibly belongs to a specialized Late Pleistocene wolf ecomorph. Its bone proportions are close to the Canadian Arctic-boreal mountain-adapted timber wolf and a little larger than those of the modern European wolf. It appears that in the early to middle Late Pleistocene this large wolf existed all over Europe, but was then replaced during the Last Glacial Maximum by a smaller wolf-type which then disappeared along with the reindeer fauna, finally replaced by the Holocene warm-period European wolf Canis lupus lupus. Genetic evidence suggests that there was little genetic variation between Late Pleistocene wolves in Europe and other contemporary Eurasian populations.

==== Changing morphology in Britain ====
In Britain, Canis lupus was the only canid species present from MIS 7 (243,000 YBP), with the oldest record from Pontnewydd Cave in north Wales. During the Ice Age, Britain was separated from Europe by only the Channel River.

A study of Pleistocene C. lupus in Britain at different time periods found that its abilities to crush, slice meat and eat bone highlighted its cranio-dental plasticity. These responses to dietary changes showed species-wide dietary shifts, and not just local ecomorphs, in response to climatic and ecological variables. The survival of C. lupus during the Pleistocene can be attributed largely to its plastic cranio-dental morphology.

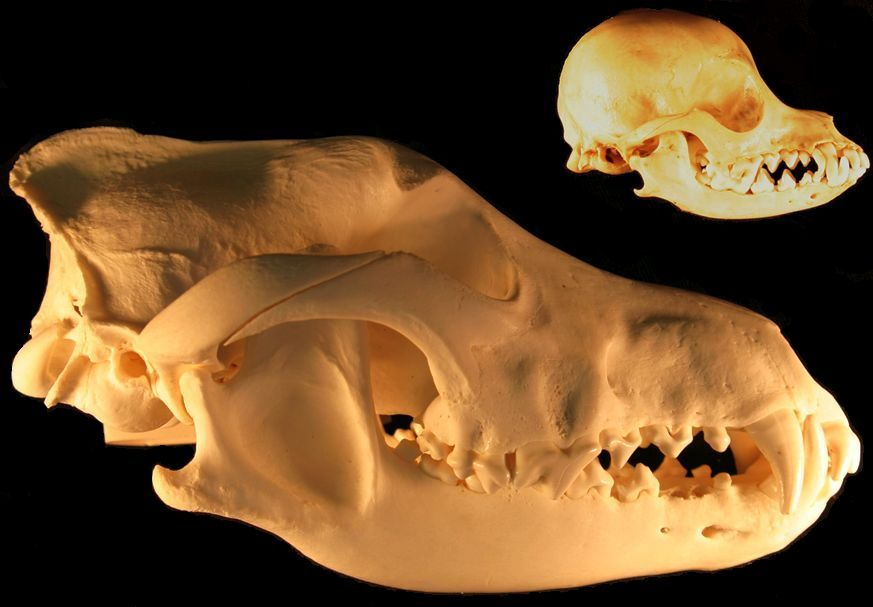
Canis lupus cranio-dental plasticity – grey wolf and chihuahua skulls

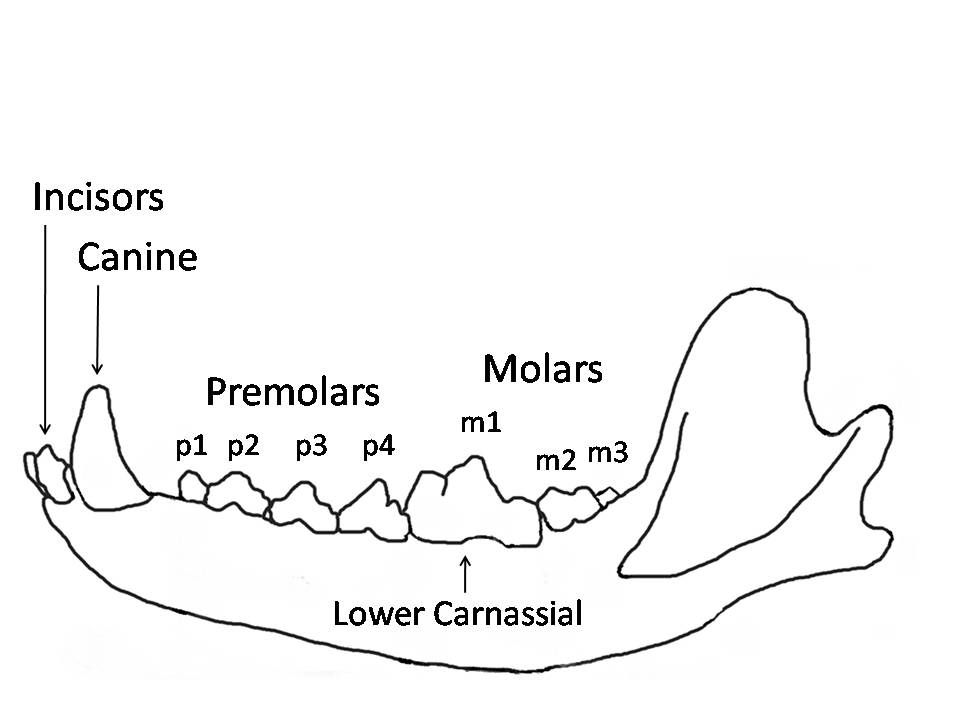
Wolf mandible diagram showing the names and positions of the teeth

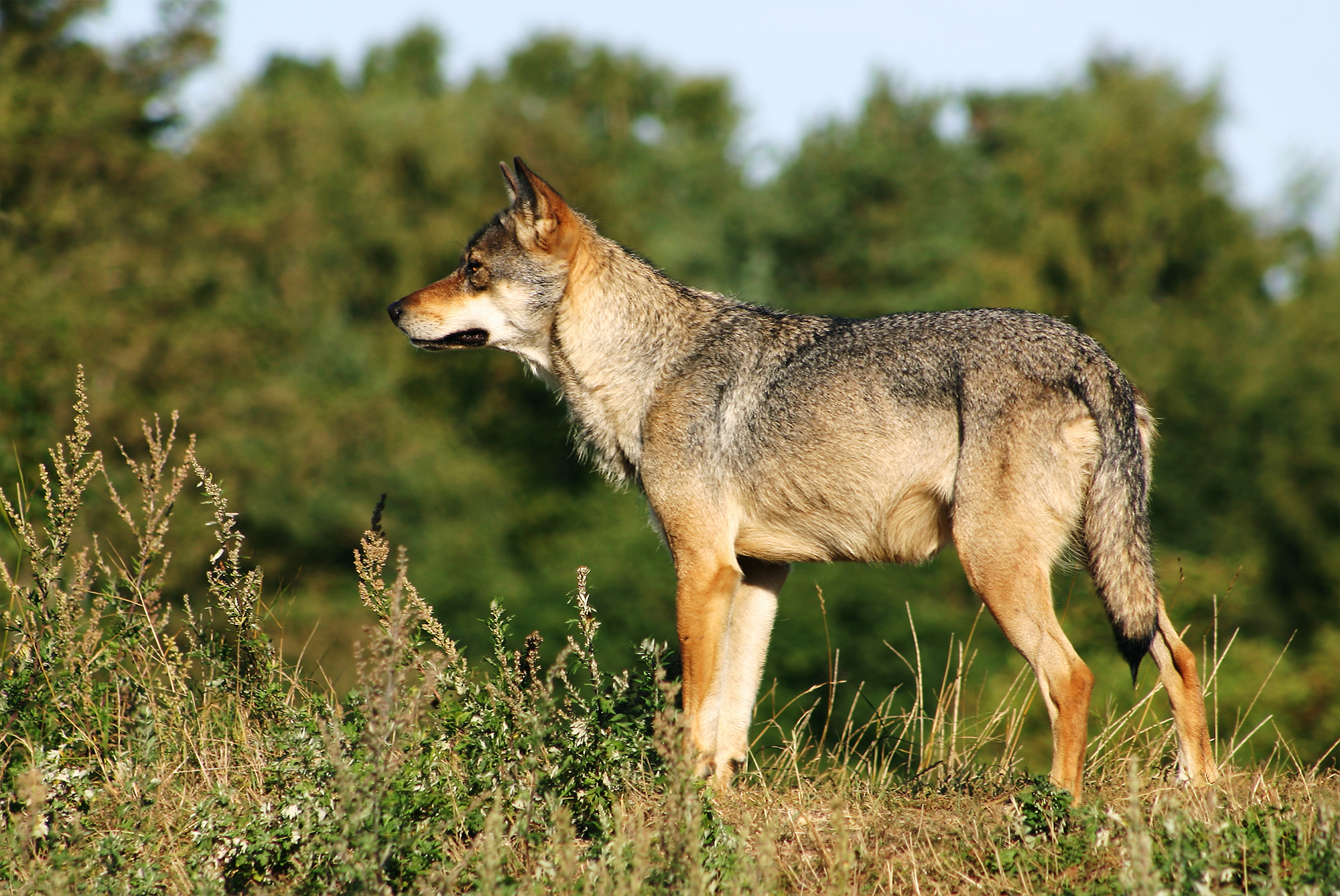
Scandinavian wolf in forest habitat

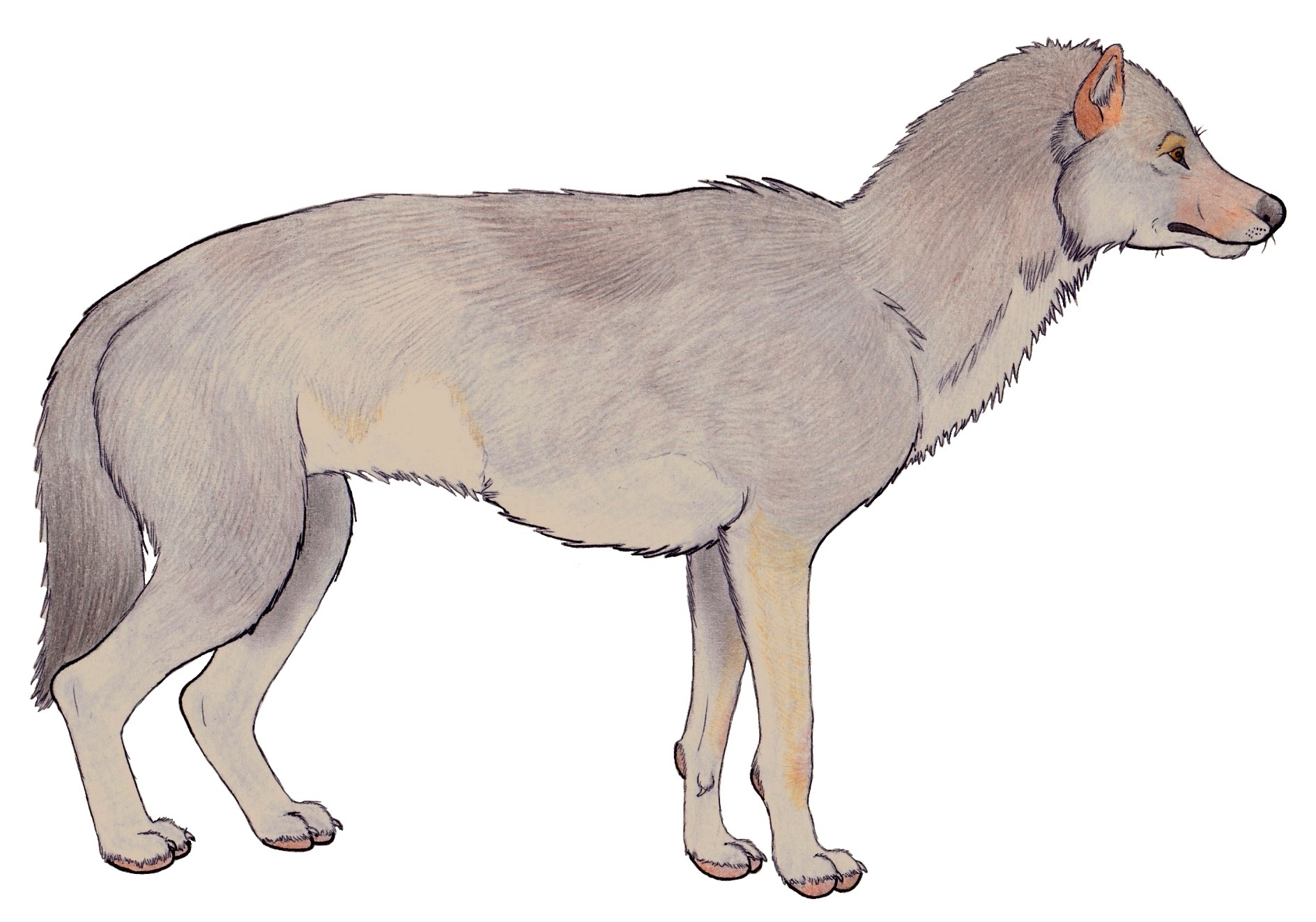
Artist's impression of a Beringian wolf

Comparison of Canis lupus variation in Britain from 243,000 YBP (MIS refers to Marine isotope stage)
Time YBP	Variables
243,000 MIS 7	Paleoenvironment was open grasslands with summer temperatures between 16 °C and 23 °C and winter temperatures between −7 °C and −6 °C dominated by steppe mammoth and horse. Competitors included the lion, brown bear, and rarely the spotted hyena. The wolves of MIS 7 were slightly smaller in body size than MIS 5 wolves and those found in Sweden today. These wolves were out-competed by the larger competitors, leading to a more omnivorous diet with increased crushing ability in an open environment that supported more types of prey and more non-meat foods than the MIS 5 period. They had shallower and narrower jaws than MIS 5 wolves and those found in Sweden today, which indicated that they could take only small to medium-sized prey. They exhibited a lower percentage of tooth breakage comparable with MIS-3 wolves. However, they had the highest percentage of moderately worn teeth.
82,000 MIS 5A	Paleoenvironment was cold, open tundra with summer temperatures between 7 °C and 11 °C and winter temperatures between −10 °C and −30 °C dominated by reindeer and bison. A large form of brown bear was top predator, with no hyena at this time. The wolves of MIS 5 were larger in body size than those found in Sweden today. These wolves suffered from a severe climate, low prey availability and dietary stress leading to a more carnivorous diet, with increased scavenging of frozen carcasses and bone consumption. They developed strong jaws and the highest flesh-slicing ability compared to the other wolves, with shallower jaws than the modern wolf but broader and deeper jaws than MIS 7 and MIS 5 wolves. They exhibited the longest and narrowest upper P4 that suggests improved slicing ability, and longest upper M1 and M2 but with reduced width and therefore reduced crushing ability, indicating a hypercarnivore. They exhibited a higher percentage of tooth breakage and severely worn teeth compared to the other wolves, and may have been using their upper P4 and lower m1 to crush bone rather than their molars, leading to a higher frequency of damage.
57,000 MIS 3	Paleoenvironment of open grasslands with summer temperature of around 12 °C and winter temperature around −20 °C dominated by woolly mammoth, woolly rhinoceros, horse, and giant deer. Competitors included the lion, brown bear, and the spotted hyena as the top carnivore. The wolves of MIS 3 were smaller in body size than MIS 5 wolves and those found in Sweden today. These wolves were out-competed by the lion and hyena, leading to a more omnivorous diet with increased crushing ability in an open environment that supported more types of prey and more non-meat foods than the MIS 5 period. They had shallower and narrower jaws than MIS 5 wolves and those found in Sweden today, which indicated that they could take only small to medium-sized prey. They exhibited a lower percentage of tooth breakage comparable with MIS-7 wolves with moderate tooth wear.
Today (Sweden)	Wolves have been extirpated in Britain but not in Sweden, where the temperatures are similar to those of Britain during the MIS 7 period. Environment of boreal forest with summer temperatures between 14 °C and 18 °C and winter temperatures between 1 °C and −10 °C. The prey species includes elk, reindeer, roe deer, boar, hares, rabbit, and beaver. Competitors include the brown bear and lynx but the wolf is top carnivore. The wolves found in Sweden today are smaller in body size than MIS 5 wolves but larger than those of MIS 7 and MIS 3. The upper M1 and M2 length is longer than for MIS 7 and MIS 3 wolves, and the jaws deeper and broader, which indicates the ability to hunt and subdue large prey. However, the large molars retained a crushing ability and to process non-meat foods. These wolves live in boreal forests where small to medium game is hard to detect and labour-intensive to subdue, leading to an adaption for hunting larger game with higher reward. They are hypercarnivores similar to MIS 5 wolves but not with the same slicing ability.

=== East Asia ===
==== Japan (Canis lupus hodophilax) ====
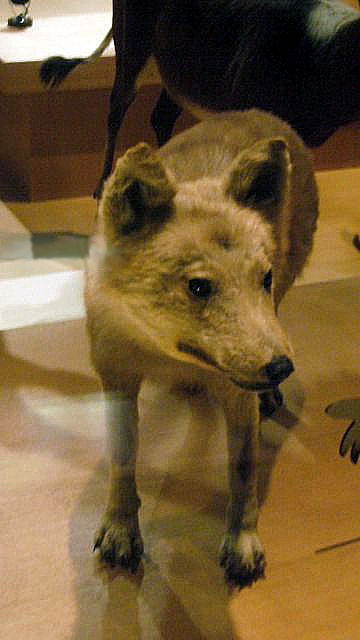
The Japanese wolf (C. l. hodophilax) was the last surviving wild member of the Pleistocene wolf lineage.

Prior to the Last Glacial Maximum, Japan was colonized by a lineage of the Siberian Pleistocene wolf via a land bridge between the Korean Peninsula and Honshu. Although these Pleistocene wolves spread across most of Japan, they did not colonize Hokkaido, which was separated by the Tsugaru Strait; Hokkaido was ultimately colonized later by the modern gray wolf (evolving into the Hokkaido wolf). Eventually, these populations were separated from the mainland, and started to genetically diverge, becoming the Japanese wolf (C. l. hodophilax). Despite the large size of mainland Pleistocene wolves, the Japanese wolves underwent insular dwarfism over time, and ultimately became the smallest of all wolf subspecies.

Although the Japanese wolf was largely revered by the people of Japan and thus not significantly affected by human presence on the islands, the introduction of rabies to Japan in the 17th century decimated the wolf population, and also turned the Japanese wolf into a target of persecution despite its previously revered nature. Policies enacted during the Meiji Restoration doubled down on the persecution of the Japanese wolf, and the last confirmed sighting of an individual is thought to have been made in 1905. It is now thought to be extinct.

== Relationship with the domestic dog ==
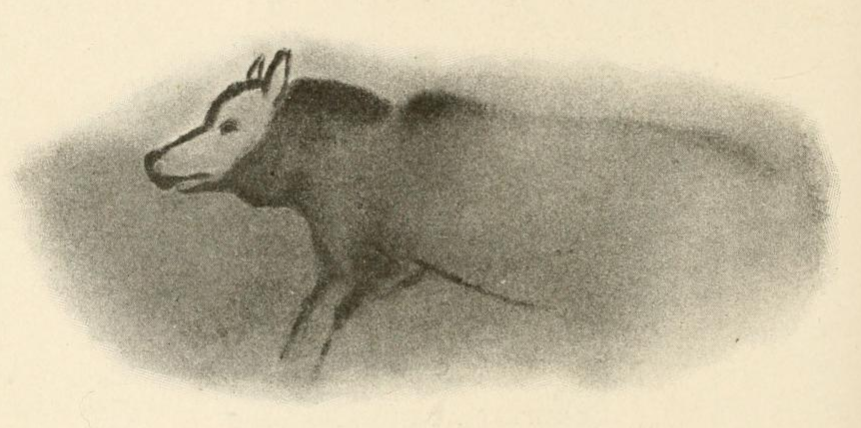
Watercolor tracing made by archaeologist Henri Breuil from a cave painting of a wolf-like canid, Font-de-Gaume, France dated 19,000 years ago.

DNA analysis indicates that dogs originated from a Pleistocene wolf lineage separate from living Eurasian and North American wolves. While some studies have suggested that all living wolves are more closely related to each other than to dogs, other studies have suggested that dogs are more closely related to living Eurasian than to American wolves. Most dogs form a sister group to the remains of a Late Pleistocene wolf found in the Kessleroch cave near Thayngen in the canton of Schaffhausen, Switzerland, which dates to 14,500 years ago. The most recent common ancestor of both is estimated to be from 32,100 years ago. This indicates that an extinct Late Pleistocene wolf may have been the ancestor of the dog, with the modern wolf being the dog's nearest living relative. A 2024 study suggested that the Japanese wolf was more closely related to dogs than it was to American or other Eurasian wolves, supporting the hypothesis that the dog was first domesticated in Eastern Asia.

== See also ==
- Italian wolf, one of the last remaining mDNA haplogroup 2 grey wolves.
- Subspecies of Canis lupus
- Pleistocene coyote
- Dire wolf
