= Mezhyrich, Cherkasy Oblast =

Village in Cherkasy Oblast, Ukraine

Mezhyrich Межиріч
- Village
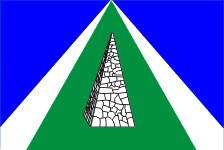
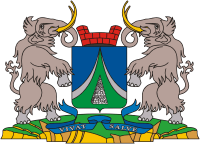
- Flag Coat of arms

- Location within Cherkasy Oblast Location within Ukraine
- Coordinates: 49°37′30″N 31°25′54″E
- Country: Ukraine
- Oblast: Cherkasy Oblast
- Raion: Cherkasy Raion
- Hromada: Mezhyrich rural hromada

Area
  - Total: 2.31 km^{2} (0.89 sq mi)

Population
  - Total: 718
  - Density: 311/km^{2} (805/sq mi)
- Time zone: UTC+2 (EET)
  - Summer (DST): UTC+3 (EEST)
- Postal code: 19035
- Area code: +380 04736
- Website: Ukrainian Parliament website

Mezhyrich (Ukrainian: Межиріч, also referred to as Mezhirich) is a village (selo) in central Ukraine. It is located in Cherkasy Raion (district) of Cherkasy Oblast (province), near the point where the Rosava River flows into the Ros'. Mezhyrich belongs to Kaniv urban hromada, one of the hromadas of Ukraine.

Until 18 July 2020 Mezhyrich belonged to Kaniv Raion. The raion was abolished as part of the administrative reform of Ukraine, which reduced the number of raions of Cherkasy Oblast to four. The area of Kaniv Raion was merged into Cherkasy Raion. Mezhyrich hosted the administration of Mezhyrich rural hromada, which was abolished and merged into Kaniv urban hromada.

== Prehistoric finds ==
Mezhyrich dwelling
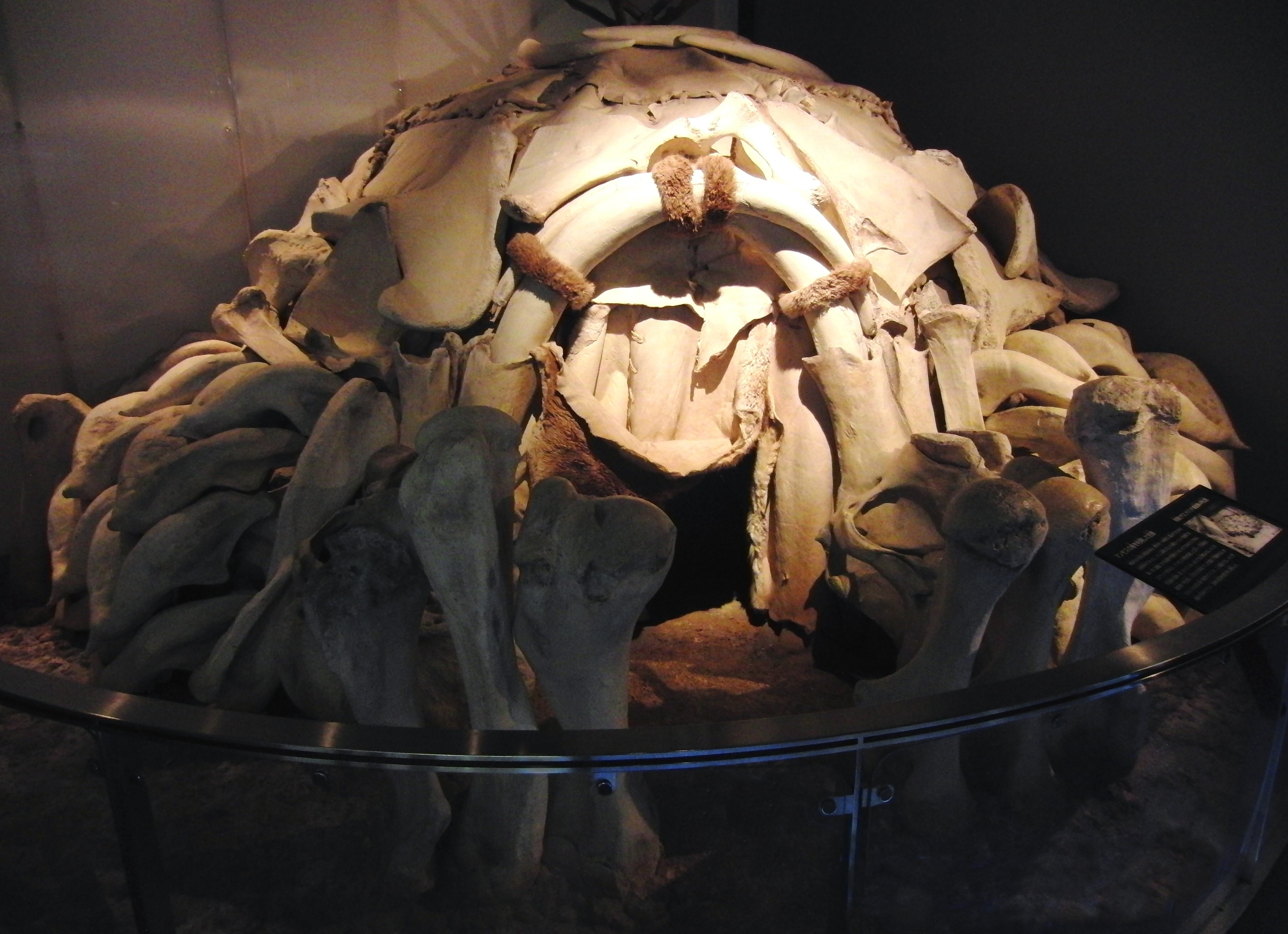
- Mammoth bone dwelling
- Interactive map of Mezhyrich dwelling

Immovable Monument of National Significance of Ukraine
- Official name: Стоянка (Dwelling)
- Type: Archaeology
- Reference no.: 230017-Н

In 1965, a farmer dug up the lower jawbone of a mammoth while in the process of expanding his cellar. Further excavations revealed the presence of 4 huts, made up of a total of 149 mammoth bones. These dwellings, dating back some 15,000 years, were determined to have been shelters known to have been constructed by pre-historic man, usually attributed to Cro-Magnon. Also found on the site:

- a map inscribed onto a bone, presumably showing the area around the settlement
- remains of a "drum", made of a mammoth skull painted with a pattern of red ochre dots and lines
- amber ornaments and fossil shells

== See also ==
- Mezine
- Prehistoric Europe
- Early and simple domes

== Bibliography ==
- Bibikov, Sergei Nikolaevich; Archaeological Institute, Academy of Sciences of the Ukrainian SSR (1981). Drevneyshyy muzykal'nyy kompleks iz kostei mamonta: ocherk materialnoi i Dukhovnoi Kultury Paleoliticheskogo Cheloveka Древнейший музыкальный комплекс из костей мамонта: очерк материальной и духовной культуры палеолитического человека [The oldest musical complex from the bones of a mammoth: an essay of the material and spiritual culture of the Paleolithic man] (in Russian). Kiev, Ukraine: Naukova Dumka. Contains a summary in English and French; table of contents also in English and French.
- Pidoplichko, I. H. (1998). Upper Palaeolithic dwellings of mammoth bones in the Ukraine: Kiev-Kirillovskii, Gontsy, Dobranichevka, Mezin and Mezhirich. Oxford: J. and E. Hedges. ISBN 0-86054-949-6.
- Pidoplichko, I. H. (1978). The Mezhirich mammoth-bone houses. U.S. Geological Survey. ASIN B0006WZGIS.
- Історія міст і сіл Української CCP – Черкаська область [History of Towns and Villages of the Ukrainian SSR – Cherkasy Oblast] (in Ukrainian). Kiev. 1972.
- Gregorovich, Andrew. "Ancient Inventions of Ukraine". FORUM. Ukrainian Fraternal Association. Archived from the original on 2024-12-02 – via InfoUkes.
- Hitchcock, Don. "Mezhyrich / Межиріч - Mammoth Camp". Don's Maps: Resources for the study of Archaeology. Archived from the original on 2026-02-05.
