= Édouard Dupont =

Belgian geologist and palaeontologist

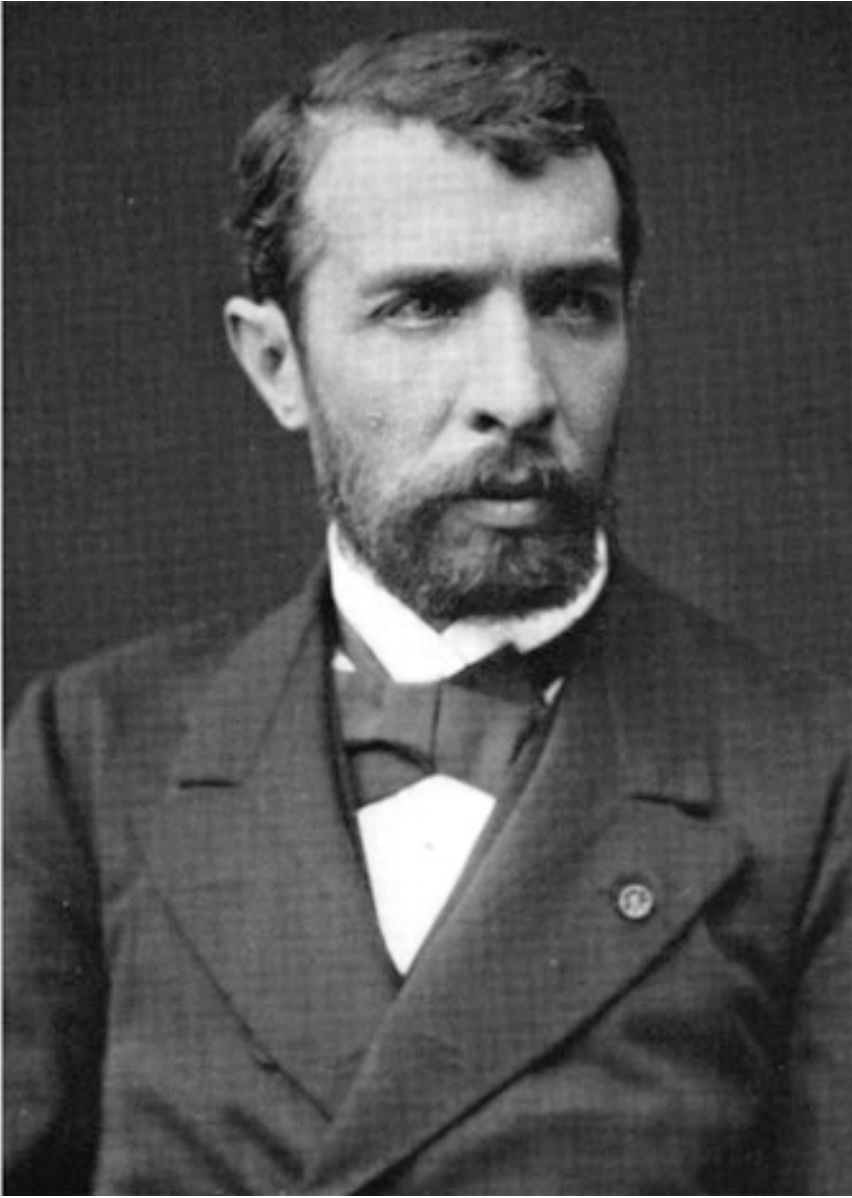

Édouard François Dupont (1841-1911) was a Belgian geologist and palaeontologist.

== Life ==
Dupont was born in Dinant on 30 January 1841. He studied at the Catholic University of Louvain, where he was awarded the degree of doctor of natural sciences. In 1868 he was appointed director of the Royal Museum of Natural History of Belgium, retiring in 1909.

From 1867, he carried out excavations at the Goyet Caves.

In July-December 1888 he carried out geological research in the Congo Free State, returning to Belgium in 1889.

He died at Cannes, France, on 31 March 1911.

== Publications ==
- Les temps antéhistoriques en Belgique: l'homme pendant les âges de la pierre dans les environs de Dinant-sur-Meuse (Brussels and Paris, 1871)
