= Goyet Caves =

Caves and archaeological site in Belgium

- Grottes de Goyet (French)
- Caves of Goyet
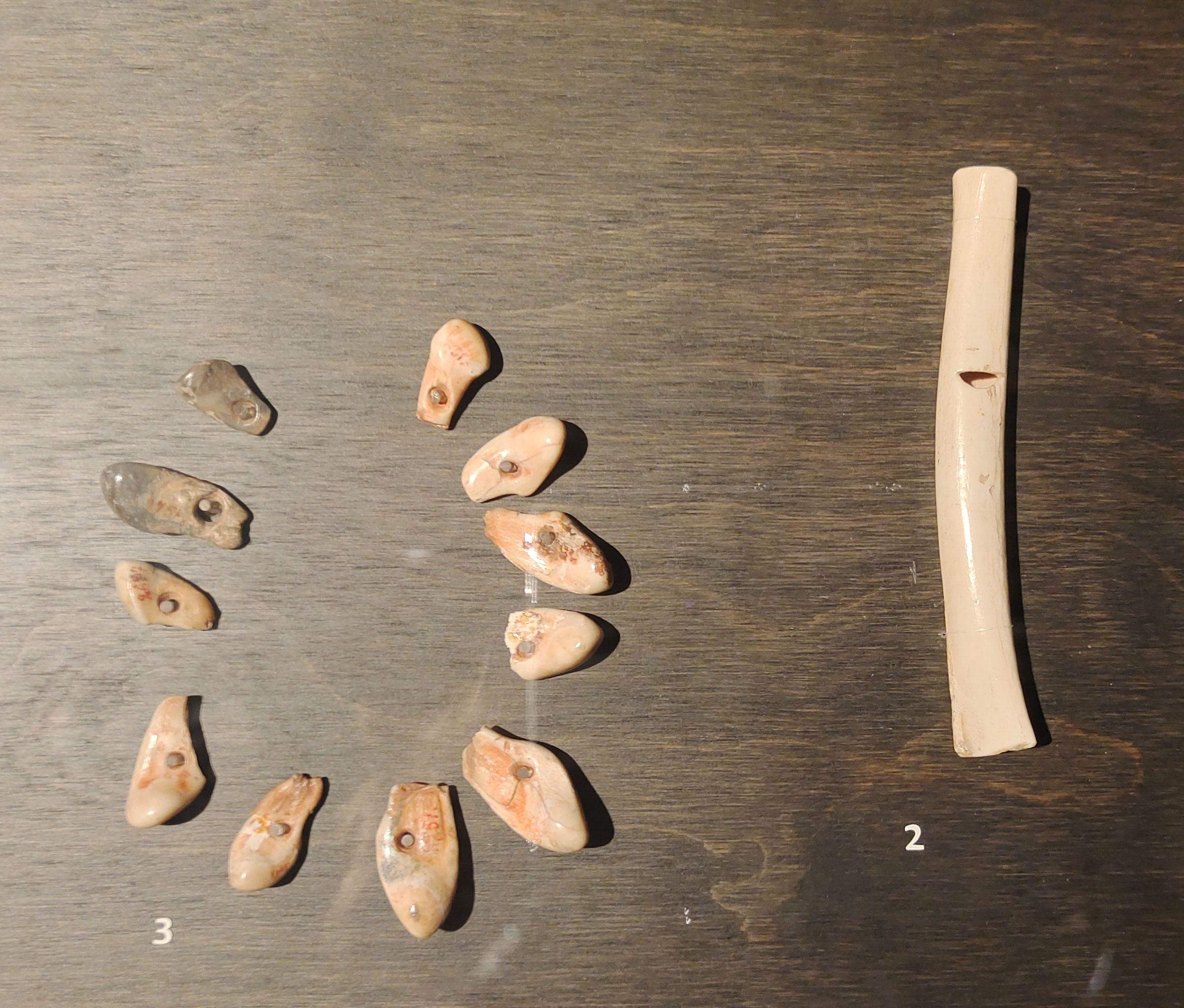
- Finds from Goyet and Trou Magrite in the Museum for Natural Sciences of Belgium

- Location Goyet Caves Goyet Caves (Belgium)
- 50°26′48″N 5°00′32″E
- Type: carboniferous limestone
- Periods: Middle Palaeolithic to Iron Age
- Cultures: Aurignacian, Gravettian, Magdalenian
- Associated with: Neanderthals, Homo sapiens
- Location: near Mozet village
- Region: Samson river valley, Gesves municipality Namur province, Belgium

Site notes
- Material: limestone Karst
- Length: 250 m (820.21 ft)
- Excavation dates: 1867,
- Archaeologists: Edouard Dupont

The Goyet Caves (French: Grottes de Goyet) are a series of connected caves located in Belgium in a limestone cliff about 15 m (50 ft) above the river Samson near the village of Mozet in the Gesves municipality of the Namur province. The site is a significant locality of regional Neanderthal and European early modern human occupation, as thousands of fossils and artifacts were discovered that are all attributed to a long and contiguous stratigraphic sequence from 120,000 years ago, the Middle Paleolithic to less than 5,000 years ago, the late Neolithic. A robust sequence of sediments was identified during extensive excavations by geologist Edouard Dupont, who undertook the first probings as early as 1867. The site was added to the Belgian National Heritage register in 1976.

== Site ==
Located just south of the Goyet Castle the caves are essentially 250 m (820.21 ft) long underground galleries, rich in speleothems and carved out of the limestone during millions of years by the waters of the Samson river inside the 90 ha (222.39 acres) limestone massif.

The massif is divided into zones:

- Terrasse classique
- Troisième Caverne
- Abri supérieur
- Trou du Moulin

In 1999, an extensive network of galleries was discovered, consisting of a central and peripheral networks, named after particular areas: Régal des Fees, Atlantide, Salle de Cristal etc.

== Excavations ==
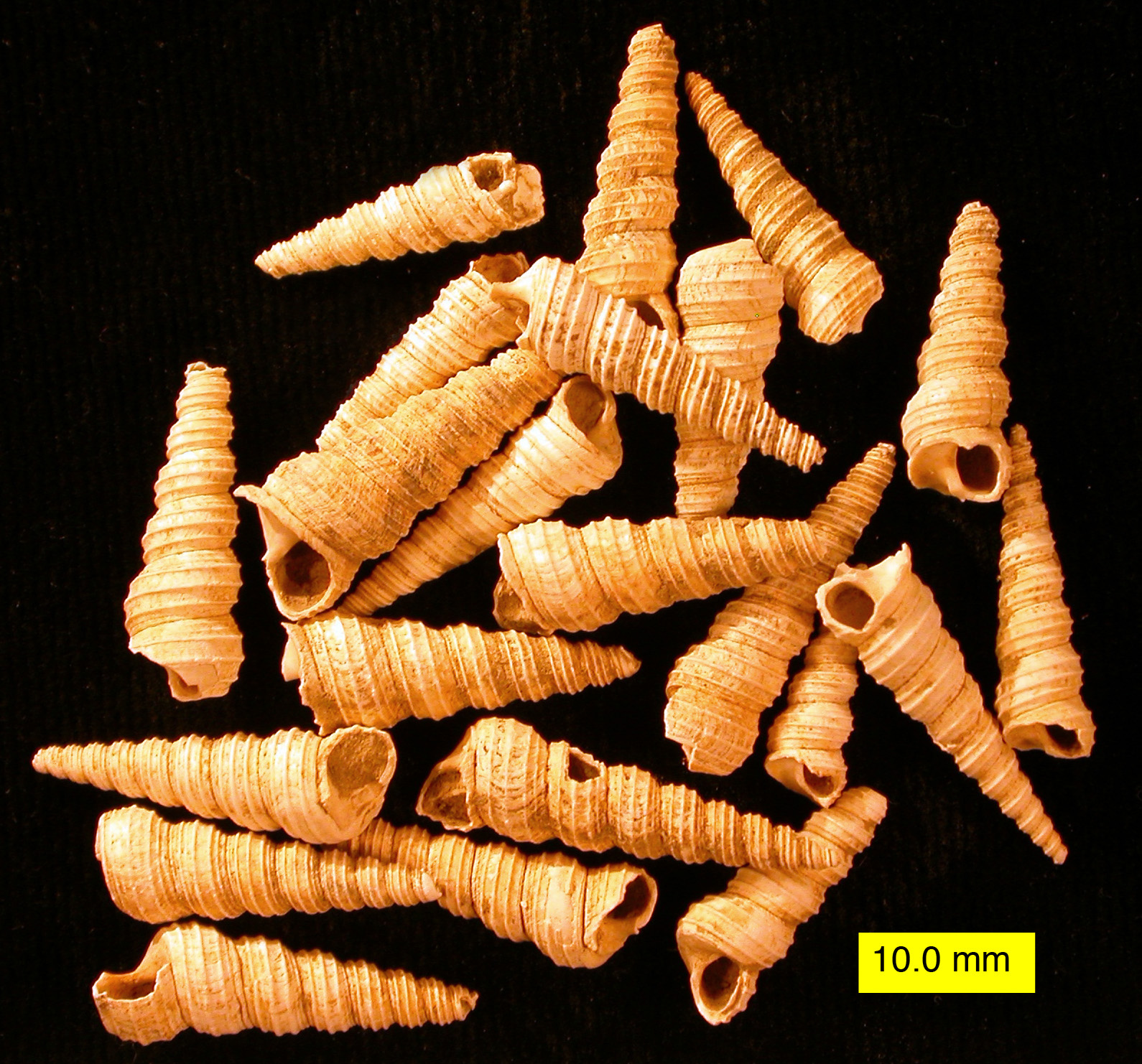
Turritella sea snails

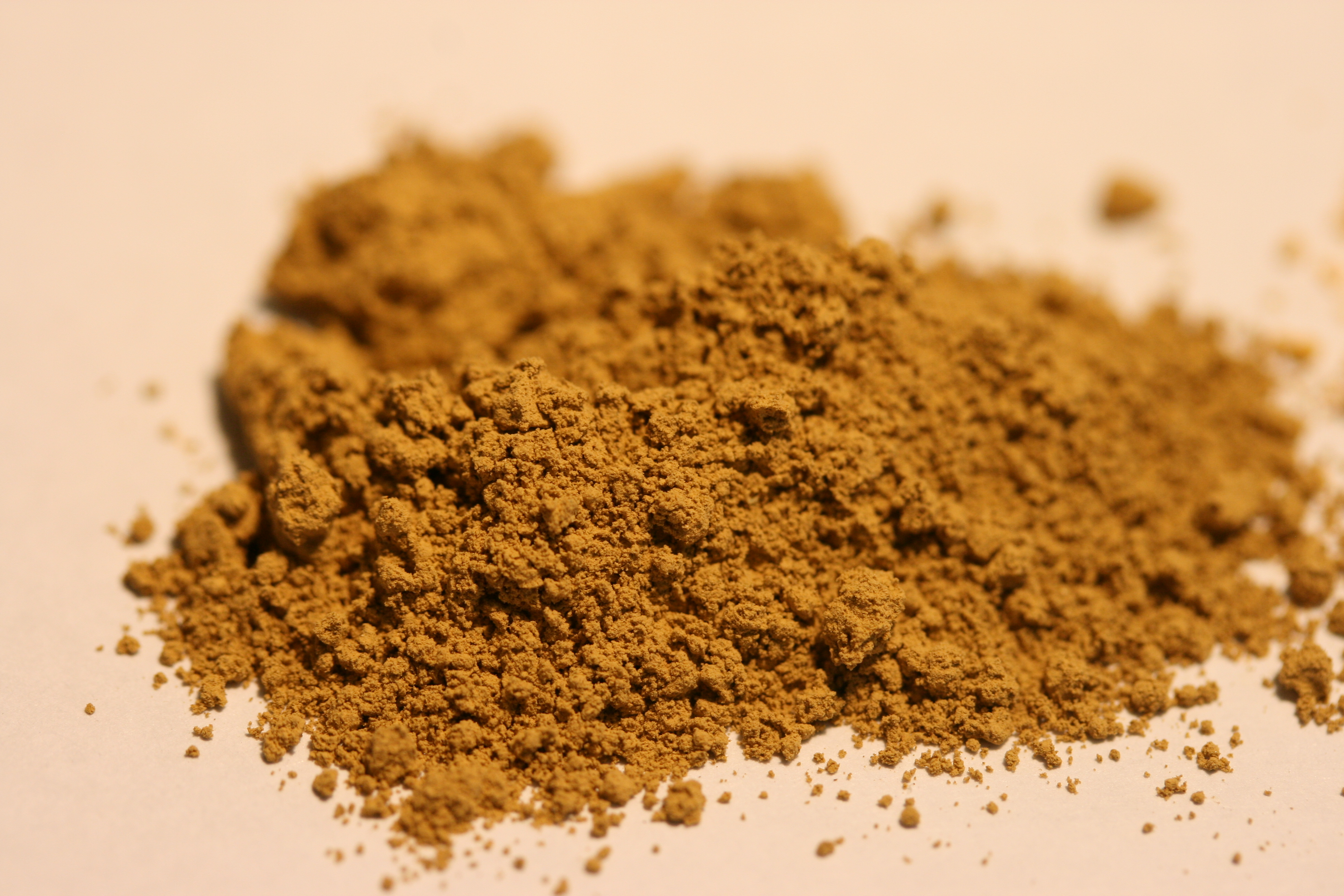
ochre pigment

=== Stratigraphy ===
Edouard Dupont identified five sediment horizons or site concentrations in the cave, three near the cave entrance and two in deeper chambers. Marcel Otte resumed excavations during the 1970s. Further excavations took place from 1998 to 2004. Contemporary researchers assert that Dupont's 19th century excavation methods "did not meet today's standards". His sediment sequences are considered to be of little reliability and his discoveries in the archives of the Royal Belgielsan Institute of Natural Sciences have been reviewed and re-classified in recent years.

- Horizon 1: Magdalenian (radiocarbon AMS dating on animal bone, ranging between 14,300 and 31,750 years ago)
- Horizon 2: Magdalenian (two dates, 14,100 to 14,760 years ago, one 29,420 uncalibrated)
- Horizon 3: Multiple mixed occupations including Aurignacian (three dates, 23,400 to 27,600 years ago)
- Horizon 4: Gravettian
- Horizon 5: primarily cave bear and cave lion bones

=== Objects ===
The site accounts for a variety of prehistoric objects: thousands of bones of prehistoric humans and large mammals, a whistle, stone artifacts with engravings, an approximately 5,000-year-old child's grave, the fossilized cranium of a Paleolithic dog, a knife made from a human rib, the largest collection of Neanderthal fossils of Northern Europe, hand axes, harpoons, necklaces, ivory chopsticks, engraved ivory platelets, carved reindeer horn and skinned and filleted human remains, that suggest cannibalism among Neanderthals.

Horizons 1 and 2 (artifacts of the Magdalenian levels) include hand axes and a harpoon, a necklace of 26 wolves perforated teeth, bone fragments and needles, a biserial (multiple barbs on both edges) bone harpoon, a necklace, and a Turritella sea snail shell necklace.

Horizon 4 included a fossilized canid skull, which has been direct AMS dated to be 31,000 years old.

Additional artifacts can be found in numerous private collections, as during the 1950s several amateur archaeologists were permitted access to the caves.

=== Dog skull ===
Discovered during the 1860s, a dog-like cranium identified as being that of a Paleolithic dog was AMS dated to 31,680 years old. Mitochondrial DNA indicates that the canid was not a direct ancestor of modern dogs, but rather of an extinct side branch or an aborted domestication attempt.

Carbon Dated fossils:

Lab number	Material	Normalized Age	Locality
Beta-239920	bone (skull) domesticated dog	31680 ± 750	local
OxA-V-2223-49	Single bone arcelini Equus caballus (Horse)	29420 ± 170	local
KIA-18986	Single bone from rear of Chamber A Ursus spelaeus	27440 ± 170	local
KIA-22275	Single bone Alopex lagopus (Arctic fox)	12380 ± 60	local
Lv-2135	bone	11630 ± 150	local

== Human habitation ==
=== Neanderthal habitation ===
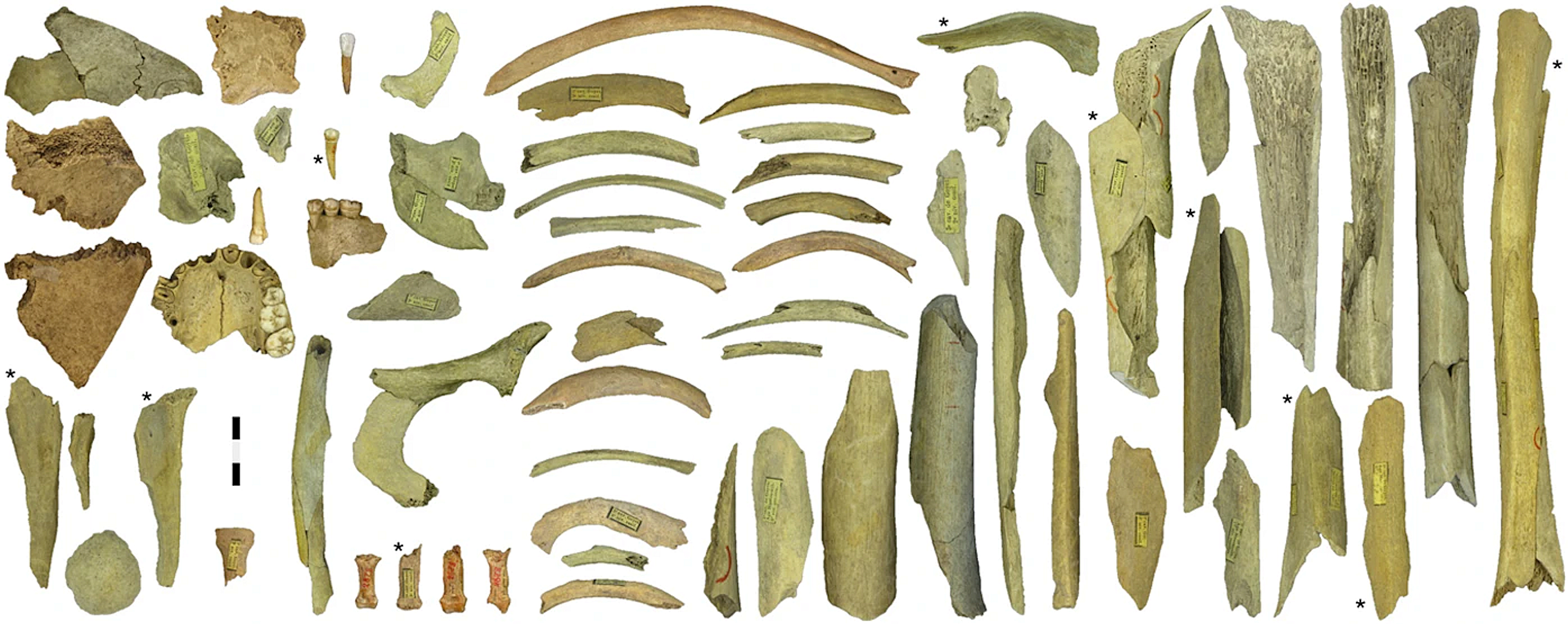
Neanderthal remains from the Troisième caverne of Goyet (Belgium). The remains have scrape marks, indicating that they were butchered, with cannibalism being the "most parsimonious explanation".

Neanderthal habitation of the caves dates back to the Middle Paleolithic. Occasional Neanderthal occupation begins 120,000 years ago and ends after 40,000 years ago.

Between 45,500 and 40,500 years ago Neanderthals lived in the Troisième Caverne, where 99 bones were discovered, that belong to at least five individuals. This represents the largest collection of Neanderthal fossils in Northern Europe. The condition of the fossils strongly suggests cannibalism. The bodies are skinned and filleted, the bones show cut marks and were cracked to extract the marrow. Reindeer remains from the site have the same types of butcher marks. Researchers consider the cannibalism at Goyet an element of inter-group conflict rather than motivated by starvation, since weaker members – mostly women and children – of competing groups were targeted and eaten even though other food sources such as reindeer were available.

In 2018, researchers succeeded in extracting nuclear DNA from Goyet Q56-1, a right femur from a Neanderthal directly dated to around 43,000-42,080 BP. DNA analysis reveals that Goyet Q56-1 was female. Compared to other Neanderthals for which nuclear DNA has been extracted, Goyet Q56-1 is genetically closest to Spy94a from Spy Cave and groups closest with other Late European Neanderthals.

=== Homo sapiens occupation ===
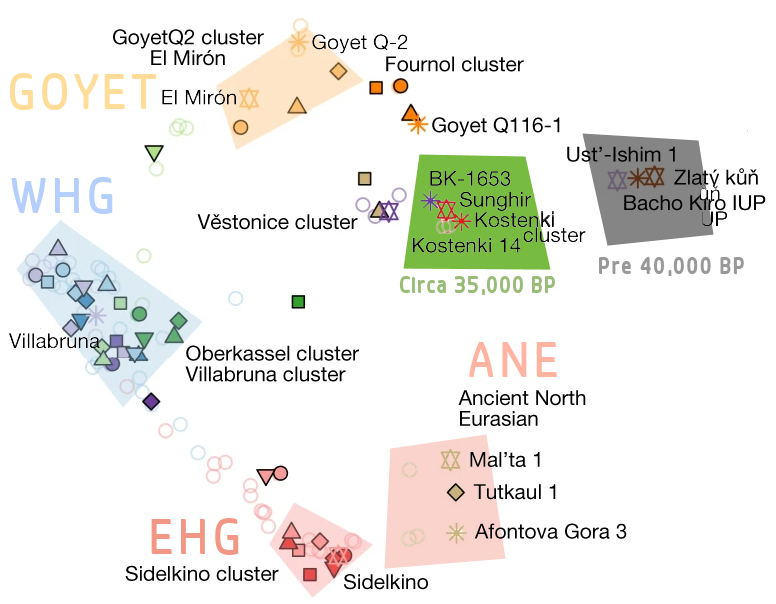
Genetic position of the Goyet cluster in relation to other hunter-gatherers

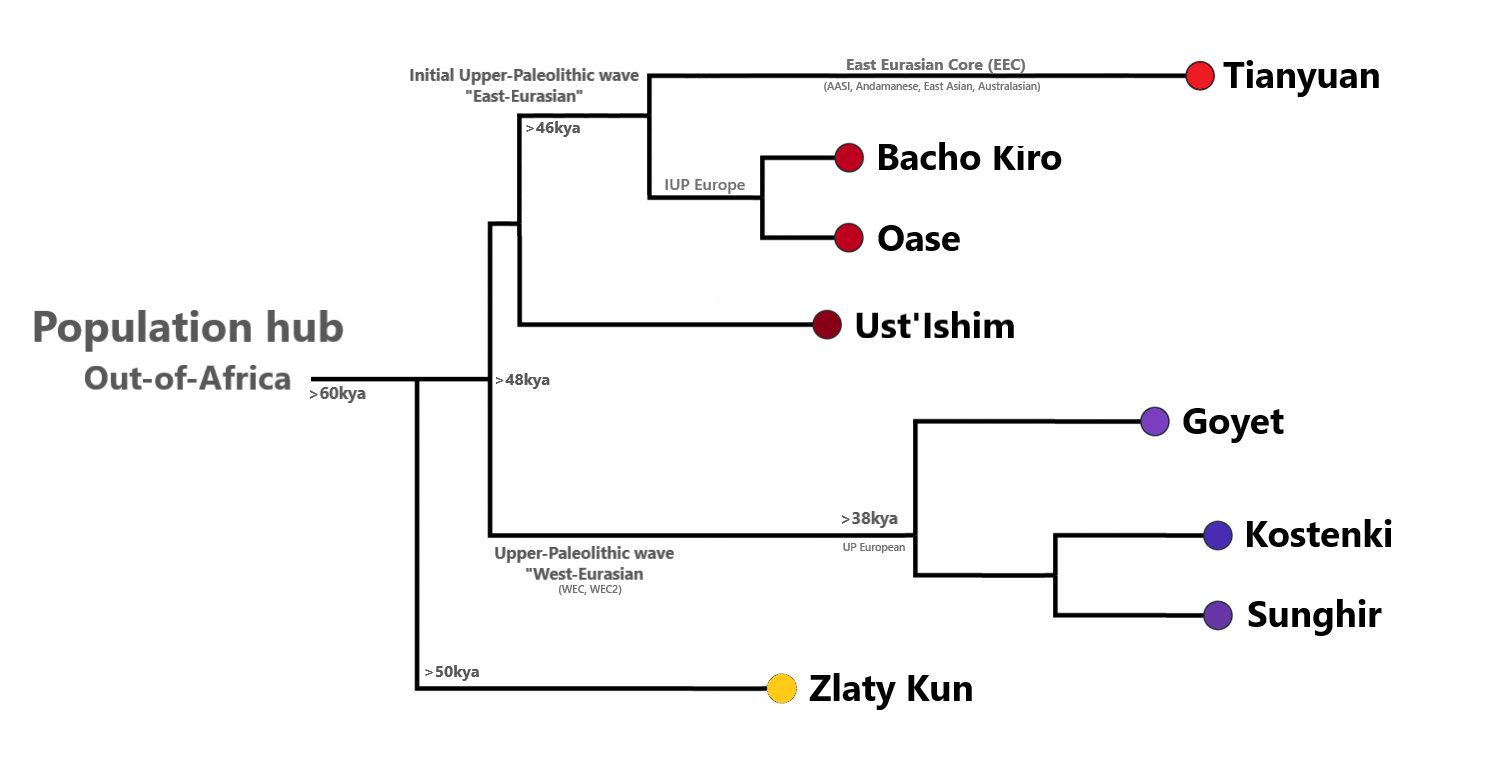
Phylogenetic position of ancient Upper Paleolithic Eurasian specimens.

Homo sapiens occupation began around 35,000 years ago. Fossils from different European populations are found in Goyet Cave, including some that represent the earliest branch of modern Europeans (ca. 35,000 BP). Their damaged but readable DNA has been used in studies of the origin and migration of European ice age populations. Based on mitochondrial DNA of five local fossils it was concluded that the first modern Europeans arrived directly from Africa without a detour via Asia. The 35,000 year old humerus of a man from Goyet has been associated with the Aurignacian culture. Shortly thereafter, the population associated with this culture was ousted by a genetically distinct Gravettian rural population (from 34,000 BP), but around 25,000 BP descendants reappear in Spain in the context of Magdalenian culture. The extent to which Neanderthals and Homo sapiens have lived together at Goyet is still under investigation.

In 1998, the bones of a twelve-year-old child was found in a crevice. The cavern was subsequently named the Salle de l'Enfant. The remains are 5,000 years old and are interpreted as representing a grave. Other cultural type elements such as perforated tubes that were perhaps used as flutes, indicate that the caves continued to be inhabited during the late Neolithic. An even younger object discovered in Goyet, attributed to the Iron Age (around 500 BCE), is a knife made from a human rib.

In 2016, researchers successfully extracted DNA from several ancient human fossils at Goyet (with direct dates): GoyetQ116-1 (35,160-34,430 BP) and GoyetQ376-3 (33,940-33,140 BP) from the Aurignacian; GoyetQ376-19 (27,720-27,310 BP), GoyetQ53-1 (28,230-27,720 BP), GoyetQ55-2 (27,730-27,310 BP), GoyetQ56-16 (26,600-26,040 BP) and Goyet2878-21 (27,060-26,270 BP) from the Gravettian; and GoyetQ-2 (15,230-14,780 BP) from the Magdalenian. GoyetQ376-19, Goyet53-1 and Goyet56-16 were found to cluster genetically with several other Gravettian individuals from Europe in the Věstonice Cluster, while GoyetQ-2 was found to cluster genetically with several other Magdalenian individuals from Europe in the El Mirón Cluster.

All later Europeans after GoyetQ116-1 show some genetic affinity for this individual. GoyetQ116-1 also exhibits more genetic affinity for the Tianyuan man than any other ancient individual from West Eurasia. GoyetQ116-1 received geneflow from an Ancient East Eurasian population (c. 17–23%), possibly represented by the preceding Bacho Kiro cave specimen, who, together with the Oase specimens, are closer to ancient and modern East Eurasian populations, and were part of the Initial Upper Paleolithic (IUP) wave. The IUP groups in Europe were largely replaced or absorbed by the succeeding Upper Paleolithic wave (Ancient West Eurasians) more than 38,000 years ago, resulting in the formation of Upper Paleolithic Europeans such as GoyetQ116-1. Villalba-Mouco et al. argues that this IUP-affiliated population pre-dated the split between European and Asian populations.

Culturally, the Aurignacian cultural complex is chronologically associated with the human remains of Goyet Q116-1, while the subsequent Gravettian is associated with the Vestonice cluster.

== See also ==
- Cannibalism in Europe § Prehistory

== Bibliography ==
- Mark Derr (October 27, 2011). How the Dog Became the Dog: From Wolves to Our Best Friends. The Overlook Press. pp. 69–. ISBN 978-1-59020-991-2.
