= Accession number (bioinformatics) =

Unique identifier given to DNA or a protein sequence

An accession number, in bioinformatics, is a unique identifier given to a DNA or protein sequence record to allow for tracking of different versions of that sequence record and the associated sequence over time in a single data repository. Because of its relative stability, accession numbers can be utilized as foreign keys for referring to a sequence object, but not necessarily to a unique sequence. All sequence information repositories implement the concept of "accession number" but might do so with subtle variations.

== LRG ==
Locus Reference Genomic (LRG) records have unique accession numbers starting with LRG_ followed by a number. They are recommended in the Human Genome Variation Society Nomenclature guidelines, as stable genomic reference sequences to report sequence variants in LSDBs and the literature.

== Notes and references ==
1. Amos Bairoch; Rolf Apweiler; Cathy H. Wu. "User Manual". UniProt Knowledgebase. Archived from the original on 21 September 2005.
2. This article incorporates public domain material from NCBI Handbook. National Center for Biotechnology Information.
