= Mezine =

Archaeological site in Ukraine

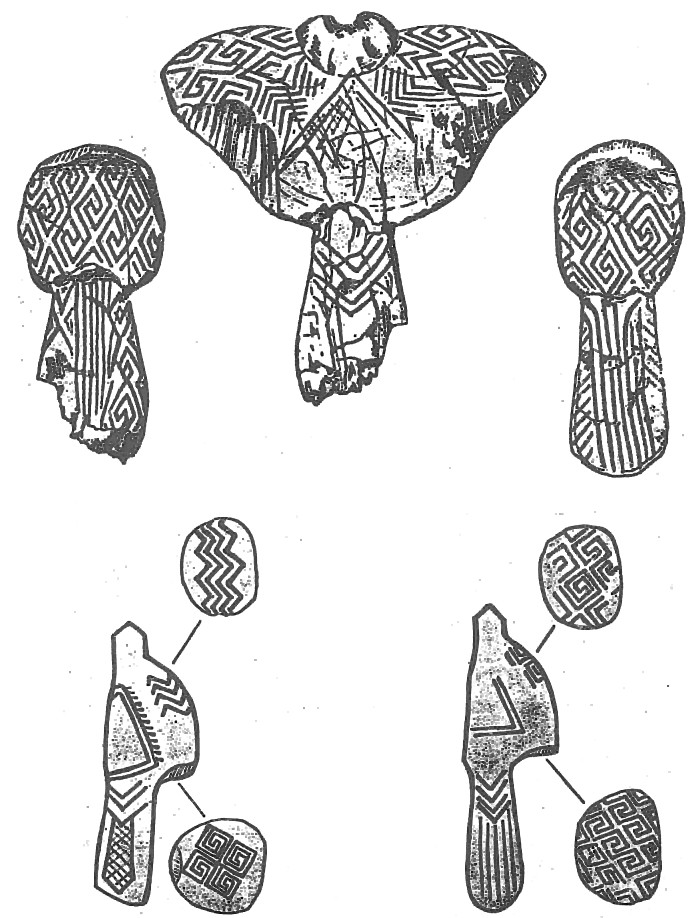
- Meander pattern on artifact in Mezine

- Location within Chernihiv Oblast Location within Ukraine Location within Europe
- 51°48′57″N 33°4′12″E
- Location: Chernihiv Oblast, Ukraine

Immovable Monument of Local Significance of Ukraine
- Official name: Стоянка «Мезинська» (Mezyn Dwelling)
- Type: Archaeology
- Reference no.: 807-Чр

Mezine or Mezyn (Ukrainian: Мезин) is an archaeological site in Ukraine, located alongside the Desna River in Novhorod-Siverskyi Raion of Chernihiv Oblast, near the village of Mezine. It has the country's greatest number of finds originating from the Paleolithic period. The site is known for an archaeological find of a set of engraved bracelets, with marks possibly representing calendar lunar-cycles.

Also found near Mezine was the earliest known example of a meander pattern as described by Marija Gimbutas, as part of a decorative object dated to 10,000 BCE. It was described (see references for illustrations) as an object carved from ivory mammoth tusks to resemble a bird. The bird is understood as an inherently shamanistic animal, often being a symbol of the soul or of the spirit experienced in flight (from death).

== Second site ==
Mezine is an archaeological site in Ukraine. It has the country's greatest number of finds originating from the Paleolithic period. The site is located alongside the Desna River in Novhorod-Siverskyi Raion of Chernihiv Oblast, northern Ukraine, near the village of Mezine. The settlement is best known for an archaeological find of a set of bracelets engraved with marks possibly representing calendar lunar-cycles. Also found near Mezine was the earliest known example of a meander pattern as described by Marija Gimbutas, as part of a decorative object dated to 10,000 BCE. It was described (see references for illustrations) as an object carved from ivory mammoth tusks to resemble a bird.

The bird is understood as an inherently shamanistic animal, often being a symbol of the soul or of the spirit experienced in flight (from death). The site now known as Mezin 22 was found in the Dnieper valley of Ukraine in 1908. At this site, archaeologists discovered a shelter constructed of mammoth bones and skin, showing the importance of the mammoth to nomadic European cultures of the early Holocene.

== Symbolism ==
On Mezine and other sites at Yeliseevici and Timovka, Joseph Campbell comments:

It is impossible not to feel, when reviewing the material of these mammoth-hunting stations on the loess plains north of the Black and Caspian Seas, that we are in a province fundamentally different in style and mythology from that of the hunters of the great painted caves. The richest center of this more easterly style would appear to have been the area between the Dnieper and Don river systems - at least as far as indicated by the discoveries made up to the present. The art was not, like that of the caves, impressionistic, but geometrically stylized, and the chief figure was not the costumed shaman, at once animal and man, master of the mysteries of the temple-caves, but the perfectly naked, fertile female, standing as guardian of the hearth. And I think it most remarkable that we detect in her surroundings a constellation of motifs that remained closely associated with the goddess in the later epoch of the neolithic and on into the periods of the high civilizations: the meander (as a reference to the labyrinth), the bird (in the dove- cotes of the temples of Aphrodite), the fish (in the fish ponds of the same temples), the sitting animals, and the phallus. Who, furthermore, reading of the figure amid the mammoth skulls, does not think of Artemis as the huntress, the lady of the wild things.

== Sources ==
- Campbell, Joseph (1987). Primitive Mythology. Arkana. ISBN 978-0-14-019443-2.
- Haarmann, Harald (2007). Foundations of Culture: Knowledge-construction, Belief Systems and Worldview in their Dynamic Interplay'. Peter Lang. ISBN 978-3-631-56685-5.
