= Domestication of the dog =

Process which formed the domestic dog

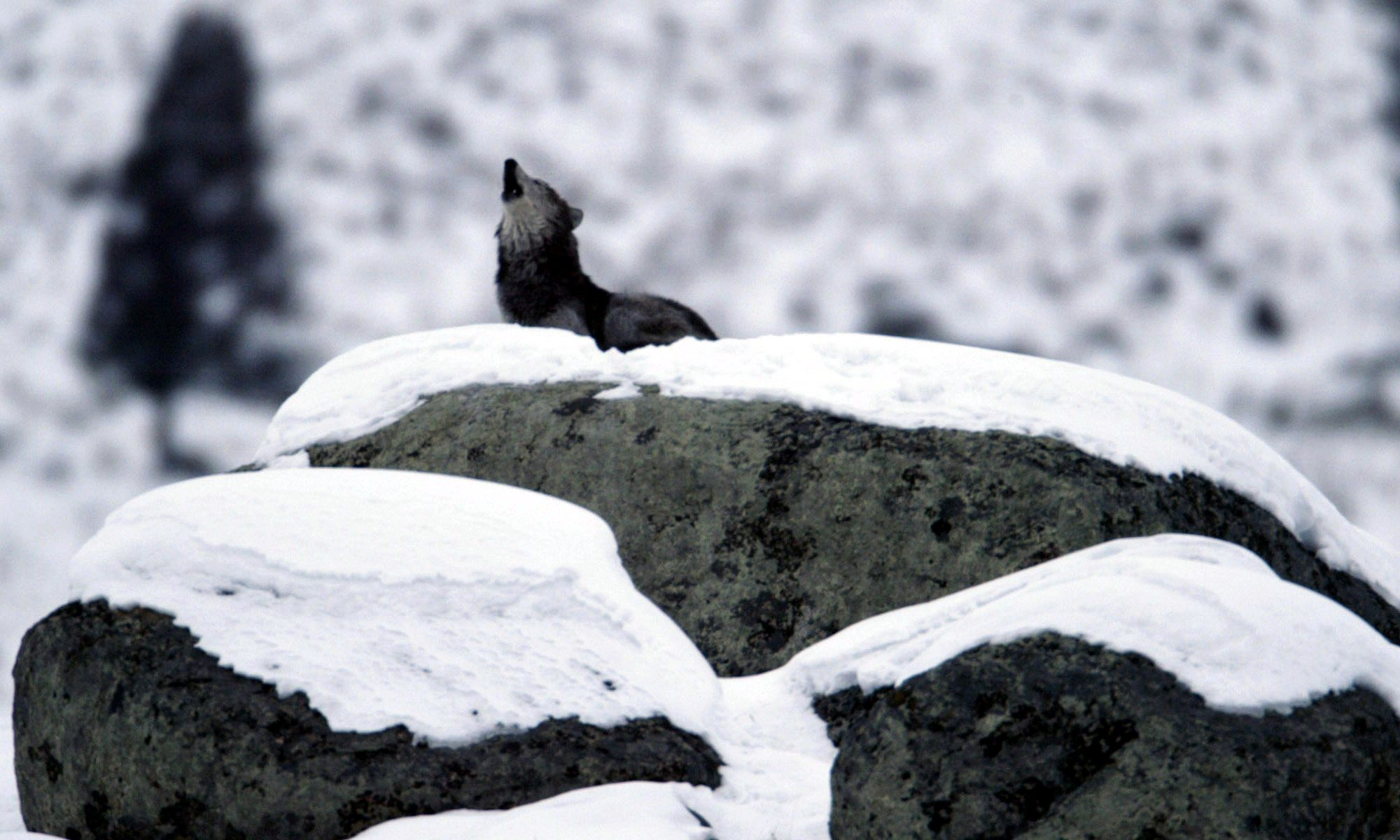
The dog diverged from a now-extinct population of wolves 27,000–40,000 years ago, before or during the Last Glacial Maximum, when much of the mammoth steppe was cold and dry.

The domestication of the dog was the process which resulted in the emergence of the domestic dog as a species (Canis familiaris). This included the dog's genetic divergence from the wolf, its domestication, and the emergence of the first dogs. Genetic studies suggest that all ancient and modern dogs share a common ancestry, descending from an ancient, now-extinct wolf population – or closely related wolf populations – which was distinct from the modern wolf lineage. The dog's similarity to the grey wolf is the result of substantial dog-into-wolf gene flow, with the modern grey wolf being the dog's nearest living relative. An extinct Late Pleistocene wolf may have been the ancestor of the dog.

The dog is a wolf-like canid. The genetic divergence between the dog's ancestor and modern wolves occurred between 20,000 and 40,000 years ago, just before or during the Last Glacial Maximum (20,000–27,000 years ago). This timespan represents the upper time-limit for the commencement of domestication because it is the time of divergence but not the time of domestication, which occurred later.

One of the most important transitions in human history was the domestication of animals, which began with the long-term association between wolves and hunter–gatherers more than 17,500 years ago. The dog was the first species and the only large carnivore to have been domesticated. The domestication of the dog occurred due to variation among the common ancestor wolf population in the fight-or-flight response where the common ancestor with less aggression and aversion but greater altruism towards humans received fitness benefits. As such, the domestication of the dog is a prominent example of social selection rather than artificial selection. The archaeological record and genetic analysis show the remains of the Erralla dog 17,500 years ago to be the first undisputed dog, but there are other disputed remains occurring 36,000 years ago. The oldest known dog skeletons were found in the Altai Mountains of Siberia and a cave in Belgium, dated ~33,000 years ago. According to studies, this may indicate that the domestication of dogs occurred simultaneously in different geographic locations.

== Timing ==
The domestication of the dog predates agriculture, and it was not until 11,400 years ago in the Holocene era that people living in the Near East formed relationships with wild populations of aurochs, boar, sheep, and goats. Where the domestication of the dog took place remains debated; however, literature reviews of the evidence find that the dog was domesticated in Eurasia, with the most plausible proposals being Central Asia, East Asia, and Western Europe. It is in Western Europe during the Magdalenian, Epigravettian, Azilian, and Laborian cultures where the oldest dog remains are found, not only the Erralla dog (17,500 cal BP), but also the oldest known human-dog coburial, Bonn–Oberkassel dog (14,500 cal BP), and other several remains: Grotta Paglicci, Hauterive-Champréveyres, Abri le Morin, Le Closeau, Anton Koba, Kesslerloch, Grotte-abri du Moulin, Pont d'Ambon, and Kartstein.

Erralla dog belonged to an archaeological level of the Magdalenian culture in Erralla site (Gipuzkoa, Basque Country, Spain). Magdalenian culture expanded from the Franco-Cantabrian region glacial refuge (North Spain, South France) to the rest of Western Europe after the Last Glacial Maximum (LGM). During this process, Magdalenian hunter-gatherers probably brought their dogs with them, as all the Palaeolithic dogs from Paleolithic Western Europe, including the Bonn–Oberkassel dog, share the mitochondrial haplogroup C with the Erralla dog. This archaeological and palaeogenetic evidence points to the special role of the LGM in dog domestication.

Other dog remains in the Near East predated agriculture, such as the Natufian dogs from Ain Mallaha, Hayonim Cave and Terrace, and Kebara Cave, the Cyprus small dogs of Shillourokambos, or the Palegawra dog (Zarzian culture).

By the close of the most recent Ice Age 11,700 years ago, five ancestral lineages had diversified from each other and were represented through ancient dog samples found in the Levant (7,000 years before present YBP), Karelia (10,900 YBP), Lake Baikal (7,000 YBP), ancient America (4,000 YBP), and in the New Guinea singing dog (present day).

In 2021, a literature review of the current evidence implies that domestication of the dog began in Siberia 26,000–19,700 years ago by Ancient North Eurasians, then later dispersed eastwards into the Americas and westwards across Eurasia. This hypothesis is derived from when genetic divergences are inferred to have happened. Ancient dog remains dating to this time and place have not been discovered, but archaeological excavation in those regions is rather limited.

== Divergence from wolves ==
Genetic studies indicate that the grey wolf is the closest living relative of the dog. Attempting to reconstruct the dog's lineage through the phylogenetic analysis of DNA sequences from modern dogs and wolves has given conflicting results for several reasons. Firstly, studies indicate that an extinct Late Pleistocene wolf is the nearest common ancestor to the dog, with modern wolves not being directly ancestral to it. Secondly, the genetic divergence (split) between the dog's ancestor and modern wolves occurred over a short period of time, so that the time of the divergence is difficult to date (referred to as incomplete lineage sorting). This is complicated further by the cross-breeding that has occurred between dogs and wolves since domestication (referred to as post-domestication gene flow). Finally, there have been only tens of thousands of generations of dogs since domestication, so few mutations between dog and wolf have occurred; this sparsity makes the timing of domestication difficult to date.

=== Pleistocene wolves ===
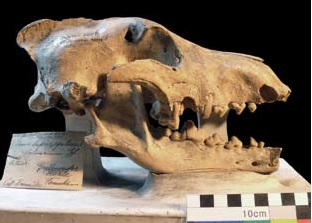
Cave wolf skull, Natural History Museum, Berlin

The Late Pleistocene era was a time of glaciation, climate change, and the advance of humans into isolated areas. During the Late Pleistocene glaciation, a vast mammoth steppe stretched from Spain eastwards across Eurasia and over Beringia into Alaska and the Yukon. The close of this era was characterized by a series of severe and rapid climate oscillations with regional temperature changes of up to 16 °C (29 °F), which has been correlated with megafaunal extinctions. There is no evidence of megafaunal extinctions at the height of the Last Glacial Maximum (26,500 YBP), indicating that increasing cold and glaciation were not factors. Multiple events appear to have caused the rapid replacement of one species by another one within the same genus, or one population by another within the same species, across a broad area. As some species became extinct, so too did the predators that depended on them (coextinction).

The grey wolf is one of the few large carnivores to survive the Late Pleistocene megafaunal extinctions, but similar to many other megafaunal species it experienced a global population decline towards the end of this era, which was associated with extinctions of ecomorphs and phylogeographic shifts in populations. Grey wolf mitochondrial genomes (excluding the Himalayan wolf and the Indian plains wolf) indicate that the most recent common ancestor for all C. lupus specimens studied – modern and extinct – dates to 80,000 YBP, and this is more recent than the time suggested by the fossil record. The fossil record suggests that the earliest grey wolf specimens were found in what was once eastern Beringia at Old Crow, Yukon, in Canada and at Cripple Creek Sump, Fairbanks, in Alaska. The age is not agreed but could date 1 million YBP. All modern wolves (excluding the Himalayan wolf and the Indian plains wolf) show a most recent common ancestor dating to 32,000 YBP, which coincides with the commencement of their global demographic decline.

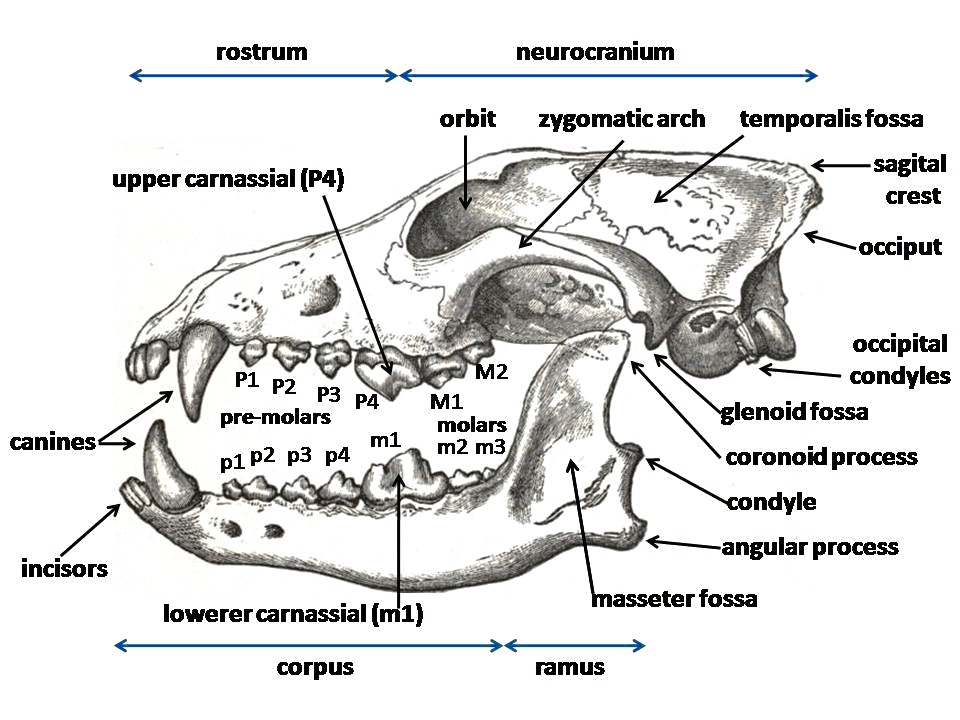
Diagram of a wolf skull with key features labelled

The origin of dogs is couched in the biogeography of wolf populations that lived during the Late Pleistocene. The fossil record shows evidence of changes in the morphology and body size of wolves during the Late Pleistocene, which may be due to differences in their prey size. Wolf skeletal development can be changed due to a preference for larger prey which results in larger wolves. Considerable morphological diversity existed among grey wolves by the Late Pleistocene. These are regarded as having been more cranio-dentally robust than modern grey wolves, often with a shortened rostrum, the pronounced development of the temporalis muscle, and robust premolars. It is proposed that these features were specialized adaptations for the processing of carcass and bone associated with the hunting and scavenging of Pleistocene megafauna. Compared with modern wolves, some Pleistocene wolves showed an increase in tooth breakage that is similar to that seen in the extinct dire wolf. This suggests that these either often processed carcasses, or that they competed with other carnivores and needed to quickly consume their prey. The frequency and location of tooth fractures found in these wolves compared with the modern spotted hyena indicates that these wolves were habitual bone crackers. These ancient wolves carried mitochondrial lineages which cannot be found among modern wolves, which implies that the ancient wolves went extinct.

Grey wolves suffered a species-wide population bottleneck (reduction) approximately 25,000 YBP during the Last Glacial Maximum. This was followed by a single population of modern wolves expanding out of a Beringia refuge to repopulate the wolf's former range, replacing the remaining Late Pleistocene wolf populations across Eurasia and North America as they did so. This source population probably did not give rise to dogs, but it admixed with dogs which allowed them to gain coat colour genes that are also related to immunity. There is little genetic information available on the ancient wolves that existed prior to the bottleneck. However, studies show that one or more of these ancient populations is more directly ancestral to dogs than are modern wolves, and conceivably these were more prone to domestication by the first humans to expand into Eurasia.

An apex predator sits on the top trophic level of the food chain, while a mesopredator sits further down the food chain and is dependent on smaller animals. Towards the end of the Pleistocene era, most of today's apex predators were mesopredators, including the wolf. During the ecological upheaval associated with the close of the Late Pleistocene, one type of wolf population rose to become today's apex predator and another joined with humans to become an apex consumer. The domestication of this lineage ensured its evolutionary success through its expansion into a new ecological niche.

For a long time scientists assumed that dogs evolved from the modern grey wolf. But a study published in 2014 concluded that this was incorrect, and that dogs are descended from an extinct type of wolf.

It was such a long standing view that the gray wolf that we know today was around for hundreds of thousands of years and that dogs derived from them. We're very surprised that they're not.

— Robert K. Wayne

=== Time of genetic divergence ===
The date estimated for the divergence of a domestic lineage from a wild one does not necessarily indicate the start of the domestication process but it does provide an upper boundary. The divergence of the lineage that led to the domestic horse from the lineage that led to the modern Przewalski's horse is estimated to have occurred around 45,000 YBP but the archaeological record indicates 5,500 YBP. The variance can be due to modern wild populations not being the direct ancestor of the domestic ones, or to a divergence caused by changes in the climate, topography, or other environmental influences. Recent studies indicate that a genetic divergence occurred between the dog's ancestor and modern wolves 20,000–40,000 YBP; however, this is the upper time-limit for domestication because it represents the time of divergence and not the time of domestication.

In 2013, the mitochondrial DNA (mDNA) sequencing of ancient wolves together with whole genome sequencing of modern dogs and wolves indicated a divergence time of 19,000–32,000 YBP. In 2014, another study indicated 11,000–16,000 YBP based on the modern wolf's mutation rate. The first draft genome sequence of a Pleistocene wolf was published in 2015. This wolf from the Taymyr Peninsula belonged to a population that had diverged from the ancestors of both modern wolves and dogs. Radiocarbon dating indicates its age to be 35,000 YBP, and this age could then be used to calibrate the wolf's mutation rate, indicating that the genetic divergence between the dog's ancestor and modern wolves occurred before the Last Glacial Maximum, between 27,000 and 40,000 YBP. When the Pleistocene wolf's mutation rate was applied to the timing of the earlier 2014 study which had originally used the modern wolf's mutation rate, that study gave the same result of 27,000–40,000 YBP. In 2017, a study compared the nuclear genome (from the cell nucleus) of three ancient dog specimens and found evidence of a single dog-wolf divergence occurring between 36,900 and 41,500 YBP.

Prior to genetic divergence, the population of wolves ancestral to the dog outnumbered all other wolf populations, and after divergence the dog population underwent a population reduction to be much lower.

In 2020, a genomic study of Eurasian wolves found that they and the dog share a common ancestor which is dated to 36,000 YBP. This finding supports the theory that all modern wolves descend from a single population which expanded after the Last Glacial Maximum and replaced other wolf populations that were adapted to different climatic conditions, and the finding of dog-like fossils dated over 30,000 YBP.

=== Place of genetic divergence ===
==== Based on modern DNA ====
Genetic studies have found that the modern dogs from Southeast Asia show greater genetic diversity than those dogs from other regions, suggesting that this was the place of their origin. A similar study found greater genetic diversity in African village dogs than in breed dogs. An East Asian origin has been questioned because dog fossils have been found in Europe dating around 17,000 YBP but only 12,000 YBP in far eastern Russia. The reply is that archaeological studies in East Asia lag behind those in Europe, and that the environmental conditions in southern East Asia do not favour the preservation of fossils. Although primitive forms of the dog may have existed in Europe in the past, the genetic evidence indicates that these were later replaced by dogs that have migrated from southern East Asia, however, a more recent study found no support for this replacement. In 2017, a literature review found that this East Asian study sampled only east Asian indigenous dogs and compared their patterns of genetic diversity to those of breed dogs from other geographic regions. As it is known that the genetic bottlenecks associated with formation of breeds strongly reduce genetic diversity, this was not an appropriate comparison.

One DNA study concluded that dogs originated in Central Asia because dogs from there exhibit the lowest levels of linkage disequilibrium. In 2017, a literature review found that because it is known that the genetic bottlenecks associated with formation of breeds raise linkage disequilibrium, the comparison of purebred with village dogs was not appropriate.

Another DNA study indicated that dogs originated in the Middle East due to the sharing of DNA between dogs and Middle Eastern grey wolves. In 2011, a study found this indication to be incorrect because there had been hybridization between dogs and Middle Eastern grey wolves. In 2012, a study indicated that dogs derived from wolves originating in the Middle East and Europe and this was consistent with the archaeological record. In 2014, a genomic study found that no modern wolf from any region was any more genetically closer to the dog than any other, implying that the dog's ancestor was extinct.

==== Based on ancient DNA ====
In 2018, a literature review found that most genetic studies conducted over the last two decades were based on modern dog breeds and extant wolf populations, with their findings dependent on a number of assumptions. These studies assumed that the extant wolf was the ancestor of the dog, and did not consider genetic admixture between wolves and dogs, or the impact of incomplete lineage sorting. These pre-genomic studies have suggested an origin of dogs in Southeast Asia, East Asia, Central Asia, the Middle East, or Europe. More recently, the field of Paleogenomics applies the latest molecular technologies to fossil remains that still contain useful ancient DNA.

===== Arctic Siberia =====
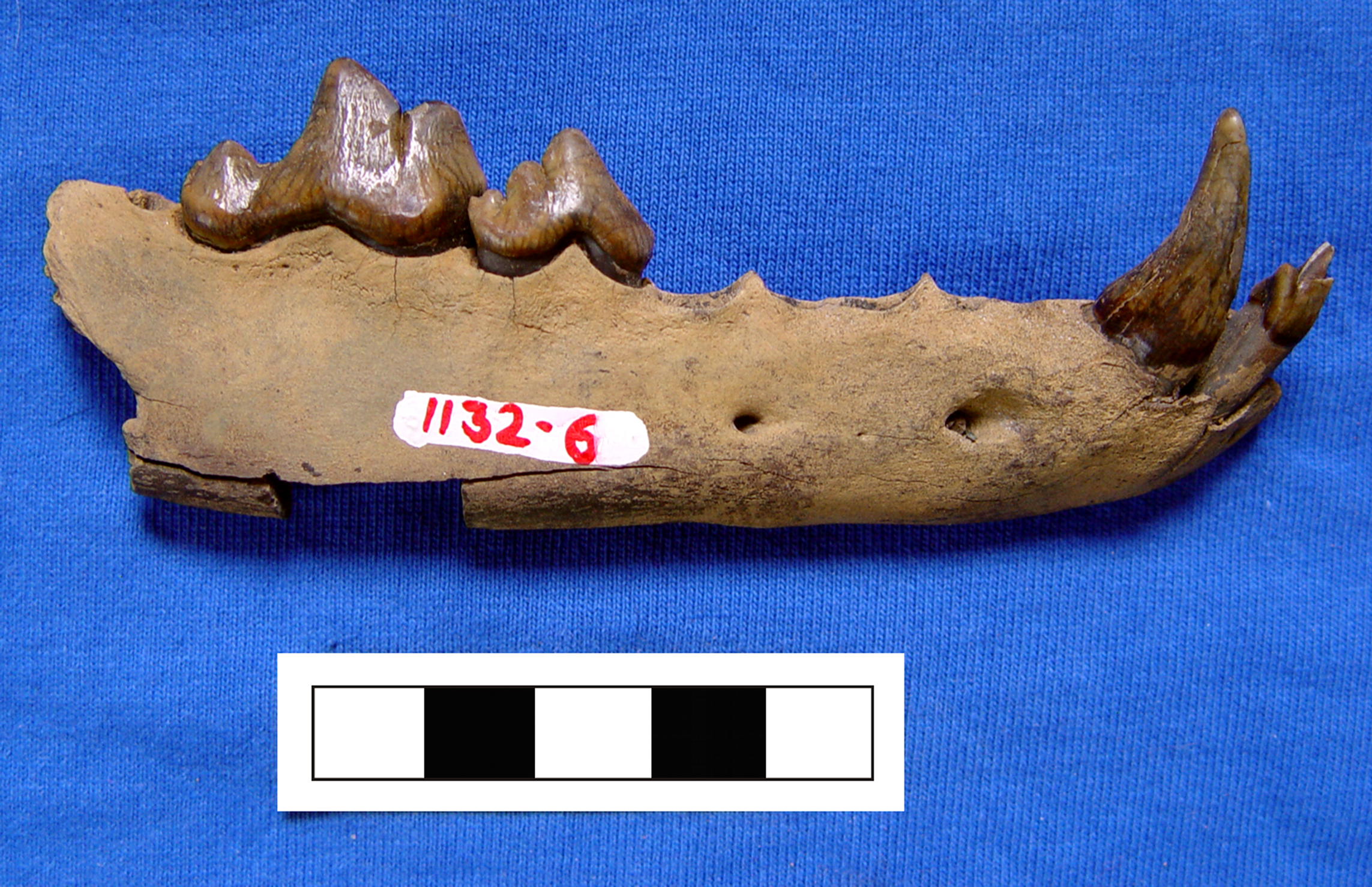
Mandible of Canis c.f. variabilis from northeastern Siberia dated 360,000–400,000 years old

In 2015, a study recovered mDNA from ancient canid specimens that were discovered on Zhokhov Island and the Yana river, arctic Siberia. These specimens included the mandible of a 360,000–400,000 YBP Canis cf. variabilis (where cf. is a Latin term meaning uncertain). Phylogenetic analyses of these canids revealed nine mDNA haplotypes not detected before. The Canis cf. variabilis specimen clustered with other wolf samples from across Russia and Asia. The mDNA haplotypes of one 8,750 YBP specimen and some 28,000 YBP specimens matched with those of geographically widely-spread modern dogs. One 47,000 YBP canid from Duvanny Yar (which was once a part of western Beringia) was distinct from wolves but was only a few mutations away from those haplotypes found in modern dogs. The authors concluded that the structure of the modern dog gene pool was contributed to from ancient Siberian wolves and possibly from Canis cf. variabilis.

===== Southern Siberia =====
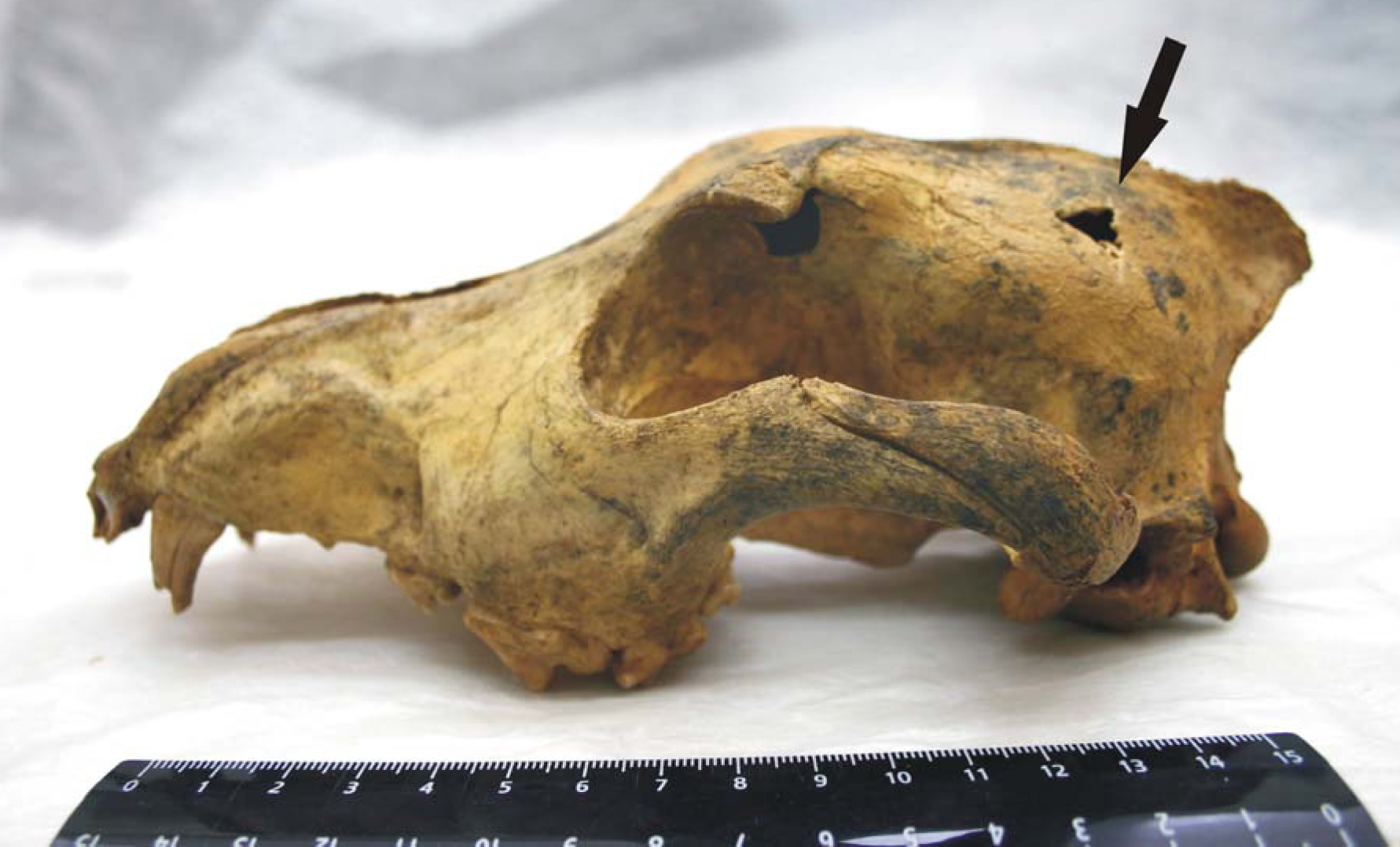
Skull of the "Altai dog" that is dated 33,300 years old

In 2013, a study looked at the well-preserved skull and left mandible of a dog-like canid that was excavated from Razboinichya Cave in the Altai Mountains of southern Siberia. It was dated to 33,300 YBP, which predates the oldest evidence from Western Europe and the Near East The mDNA analysis found it to be more closely related to dogs than wolves. Later in 2013, another study found that the canid could not be classified as a dog or wolf because it fell between both. In 2017, evolutionary biologists reviewed all of the evidence available on dog divergence and supported the specimens from the Altai mountains as being those of dogs from a lineage that is now extinct, and that was derived from a population of small wolves that is also now extinct.

===== Europe =====
The 14,500-year-old upper-right jaw of a Pleistocene wolf found in the Kessleroch cave near Thayngen in the canton of Schaffhausen, Switzerland

Phylogenetic analysis showed that modern dog mDNA haplotypes resolve into four monophyletic clades designated by researchers as clades A-D.

In 2013, a study sequenced the complete and partial mitochondrial genomes of 18 fossil canids from the Old and New Worlds whose dates range from 1,000 to 36,000 YBP, and compared these with the complete mitochondrial genome sequences from modern wolves and dogs. Clade A included 64% of the modern dogs sampled, and these are a sister group to a clade containing three fossil pre-Columbian New World dogs dated between 1,000 and 8,500 YBP. This finding supports the hypothesis that pre-Columbian New World dogs share ancestry with modern dogs and that they likely arrived with the first humans to the New World. Together, clade A and the pre-Columbian fossil dogs were the sister group to a 14,500 YBP wolf found in the Kesslerloch cave near Thayngen in the canton of Schaffhausen, Switzerland, with a most recent common ancestor estimated to 32,100 YBP.

Clade B included 22% of the dog sequences which related to modern wolves from Sweden and Ukraine, with a common recent ancestor estimated to 9,200 YBP. However, this relationship might represent mitochondrial genome introgression from wolves because dogs were domesticated by this time. Clade C, to which the Erralla dog (17,500 YBP) belongs, included 12% of the dogs sampled and these were sister to two ancient dogs from the Bonn-Oberkassel cave (14,700 YBP) and the Kartstein cave (12,500 YBP) near Mechernich in Germany, with a common recent ancestor estimated to 16,000–24,000 YBP. Clade D contained sequences from 2 Scandinavian breeds – the Jamthund and Norwegian Elkhound – and is the sister group to another 14,500 YBP wolf sequence also from the Kesserloch cave, with a common recent ancestor estimated to 18,300 YBP. Its branch is phylogenetically rooted in the same sequence as the "Altai dog" (not a direct ancestor). The data from this study indicated a European origin for dogs that was estimated at 18,800–32,100 YBP based on the genetic relationship of 78% of the sampled dogs with ancient canid specimens found in Europe. The data supports the hypothesis that dog domestication preceded the emergence of agriculture and was initiated close to the Last Glacial Maximum when hunter-gatherers preyed on megafauna.

The study found that three ancient Belgium canids (the 36,000 YBP "Goyet dog" cataloged as Canis species, along with two specimens dated 30,000 YBP and 26,000 YBP cataloged as Canis lupus) formed an ancient clade that was the most divergent group. The study found that the skulls of the "Goyet dog" and the "Altai dog" had some dog-like characteristics and proposed that this may have represented an aborted domestication episode. If so, there may have been originally more than one ancient domestication event for dogs as there was for domestic pigs.

One review considered why the domestication of the wolf occurred so late and at such high latitudes, when humans were living alongside wolves in the Middle East for the past 75,000 years. The proposal is that domestication was a cultural innovation caused through a long and stressful event, which was climate change. Domestication may have happened during one of the five cold Heinrich events that occurred after the arrival of humans in West Europe 37,000, 29,000, 23,000, 16,500, and 12,000 YBP. The theory is that the extreme cold during one of these events caused humans to either shift their location, adapt through a breakdown in their culture and change of their beliefs, or adopt innovative approaches. The adoption of the large wolf/dog was an adaptation to this hostile environment.

A criticism of the European proposal is that dogs in East Asia show more genetic diversity. However, dramatic differences in genetic diversity can be influenced both by an ancient and recent history of inbreeding. A counter-comment is that the modern European breeds only emerged in the 19th century, and that throughout history global dog populations experienced numerous episodes of diversification and homogenization, with each round further reducing the power of genetic data derived from modern breeds to help infer their early history.

In 2019, study of wolf samples from northern Italy using very short lengths of mDNA found that two specimens found in the Cava Filo archaeological site near San Lazzaro di Savena, Bologna fell within the domestic dog clade A haplogroup, with one being radio-carbon dated 24,700 YBP and the other stratigraphy dated to 20,000 YBP. The 24,700 YBP specimen matched the haplotype of ancient Bulgarian dogs, 2 historical sled dogs from the North American arctic, and 97 modern dogs. The 20,000 YBP specimen matched the haplotype of ancient Iberian and ancient Bulgarian dogs, Roman dogs from Iberia, and 2 historical sled dogs from the North American arctic. Four dog specimens found in the Bronze Age town of Via Ordiere, Solarolo, Italy dated to 3,600–3,280 years ago shared haplotypes with Late Pleistocene wolves and modern dogs.

In 2020, dog remains were found in two caves, Paglicci Cave and Grotta Romanelli in Apulia, southern Italy. These were dated 14,000 YBP and are the oldest dog remains found in the Mediterranean Basin. One specimen was retrieved from a layer where the sediment was dated 20,000 YBP, indicating the possibility of an earlier timing. The specimens were genetically related to the 17,000 YBP Erralla dog from Spain, the 14,000 YBP Bonn-Oberkassel dog from Germany and other early dogs from western and central Europe which all fall within the domestic dog mDNA haplogroup C, indicating that these were all derived from a common ancestor. Using genetic timing, this clade's most recent common ancestor dates to 28,500 YBP.

=== Morphological divergence ===
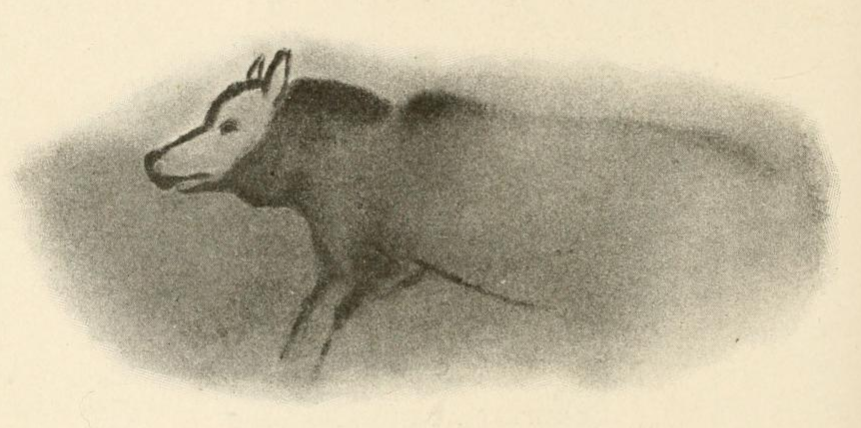
Watercolor tracing made by archaeologist Henri Breuil from a cave painting of a wolf-like canid, Font-de-Gaume, France, dated 19,000 years ago

The first dogs were wolflike. Identifying the earliest dogs is difficult because the key morphological characters that are used by zooarchaeologists to differentiate domestic dogs from their wild wolf ancestors (size and position of teeth, dental pathologies, and size and proportion of cranial and postcranial elements) were not yet fixed during the initial phases of the domestication process.

The fossil record suggests an evolutionary history that may include both morphologically dog-like wolves and wolf-like dogs. If the earliest dogs followed humans scavenging on carcasses that they left behind, then early selection may have favoured a wolf-like morphology.

The most widely accepted earliest dog remains are those of the Erralla dog which date to 17,410–17,096 BP. The humerus of the Erralla dog has already shown a reduction in size compared to wolf humeri, implying that natural or artificial selection had already affected dog morphology during the Last Glacial Period. Earlier remains dating back to 30,000 YBP have been described as Paleolithic dogs but their status as dogs or wolves remains debated.

A 2025 morphometric study analyzing 643 canid skulls spanning 50,000 years found that distinctive dog skull morphology first appeared around 11,000 years ago, with the earliest morphological dogs identified at the Mesolithic site of Veretye in Russia. The study demonstrated that substantial phenotypic diversity already existed among early Holocene dogs.

=== Proposed dual ancestry of the domestic dogs of West Asia, Africa and southern Europe ===
More recent research analysing the genomes of 72 ancient wolves, specimens from Europe, Siberia and North America spanning the past 100,000 years has confirmed that both early and modern dogs are more similar genetically to ancient wolves from Asia than from Europe. This suggests that domestication occurred in the East. The research also found evidence that dogs have a dual ancestry, meaning that two separate populations of wolves contributed DNA to dogs.

Early dogs from northeastern Europe, Siberia and the Americas appear to have a single, shared origin from the eastern source. But early dogs from the Middle East, Africa and southern Europe appear to have some ancestry from another source related to wolves in the Middle East, in addition to the eastern source. It is possible that wolves underwent domestication more than once, with different populations then mixing together; or that domestication happened once only, and that dual ancestry is related to early dogs then mixing with wild wolves.

The research also demonstrated how wolf DNA changed during the 30,000 generations that were represented in their 100,000-year timeline. This identified the effects of natural selection as particular genes spread within wolf populations. One gene variant, over a period of around 10,000 years, went from being very rare to being present in every wolf, and it is still present in all wolves and dogs today. The variant affects a gene, IFT88, which is involved in the development of bones in the skull and jaw. It is possible that the spread of this variant could have been driven by a change in the types of prey available during the Ice Age, giving an advantage to wolves with a certain head shape.

Study senior author Pontus Skoglund said: "This is the first time scientists have directly tracked natural selection in a large animal [the wolf] over a time-scale of 100,000 years, seeing evolution play out in real time rather than trying to reconstruct it from DNA today."

== Dog domestication ==
Remove domestication from the human species, and there's probably a couple of million of us on the planet, max. Instead, what do we have? Seven billion people, climate change, travel, innovation and everything. Domestication has influenced the entire earth. And dogs were the first. For most of human history, we're not dissimilar to any other wild primate. We're manipulating our environments, but not on a scale bigger than, say, a herd of African elephants. And then, we go into partnership with this group of wolves. They altered our relationship with the natural world.

— Greger Larson

Animal domestication is a coevolutionary process in which a population responds to selective pressure while adapting to a novel niche that included another species with evolving behaviours.

One of the most important transitions in human history was the domestication of animals, which began with the long-term association between wolves and hunter–gatherers more than 17,000 years ago. Dogs were the first domesticated species, the only animal known to have entered into a domestic relationship with humans during the Pleistocene, and the only large carnivore to have been domesticated. It was not until 11,000 YBP that people living in the Near East entered into relationships with wild populations of aurochs, boar, sheep, and goats. A domestication process then began to develop. The earlier association of dogs with humans may have allowed dogs to have a profound influence on the course of early human history and the development of civilization.

The questions of when and where dogs were first domesticated have taxed geneticists and archaeologists for decades. Genetic studies suggest a domestication process commencing over 25,000 YBP, in one or several wolf populations in either Europe, the high Arctic, or eastern Asia. There is clear evidence that dogs were derived from grey wolves during the initial phases of domestication. The wolf population(s) that were involved are likely to be extinct. Despite numerous genetic studies of both modern dogs and ancient dog remains, there is no firm consensus regarding either the timing or location(s) of domestication, the number of wolf populations that were involved, or the long-term effects domestication has had on the dog's genome.

Around 10,000 YBP agriculture was developed resulting in a sedentary lifestyle, along with phenotype divergence of the dog from its wolf ancestors, including variance in size. Two population bottlenecks have occurred to the dog lineage, one due to the initial domestication and one due to the formation of dog breeds.

=== Socialization ===
Humans and wolves both exist in complex social groups. How humans and wolves got together remains unknown. One view holds that domestication is a process that is difficult to define. The term was developed by anthropologists with a human-centric view in which humans took wild animals (ungulates) and bred them to be "domestic", usually in order to provide improved food or materials for human consumption. That term may not be appropriate for a large carnivore such as the dog. This alternate view regards dogs as being either socialized and able to live among humans, or unsocialized. There exist today dogs that live with their human families but are unsocialized and will threaten strangers defensively and aggressively no differently than a wild wolf. There also exists a number of cases where wild wolves have approached people in remote places, attempting to initiate play and to form companionship. One such notable wolf was Romeo, a gentle black wolf that formed relationships with the people and dogs of Juneau, Alaska. This view holds that before there could have been domestication of the wolf, there had to have been its socialization.

Even today, the wolves on Ellesmere Island do not fear humans, which is thought to be due to them seeing humans so little, thus approaching humans cautiously, curiously and closely.

=== Commensal pathway ===
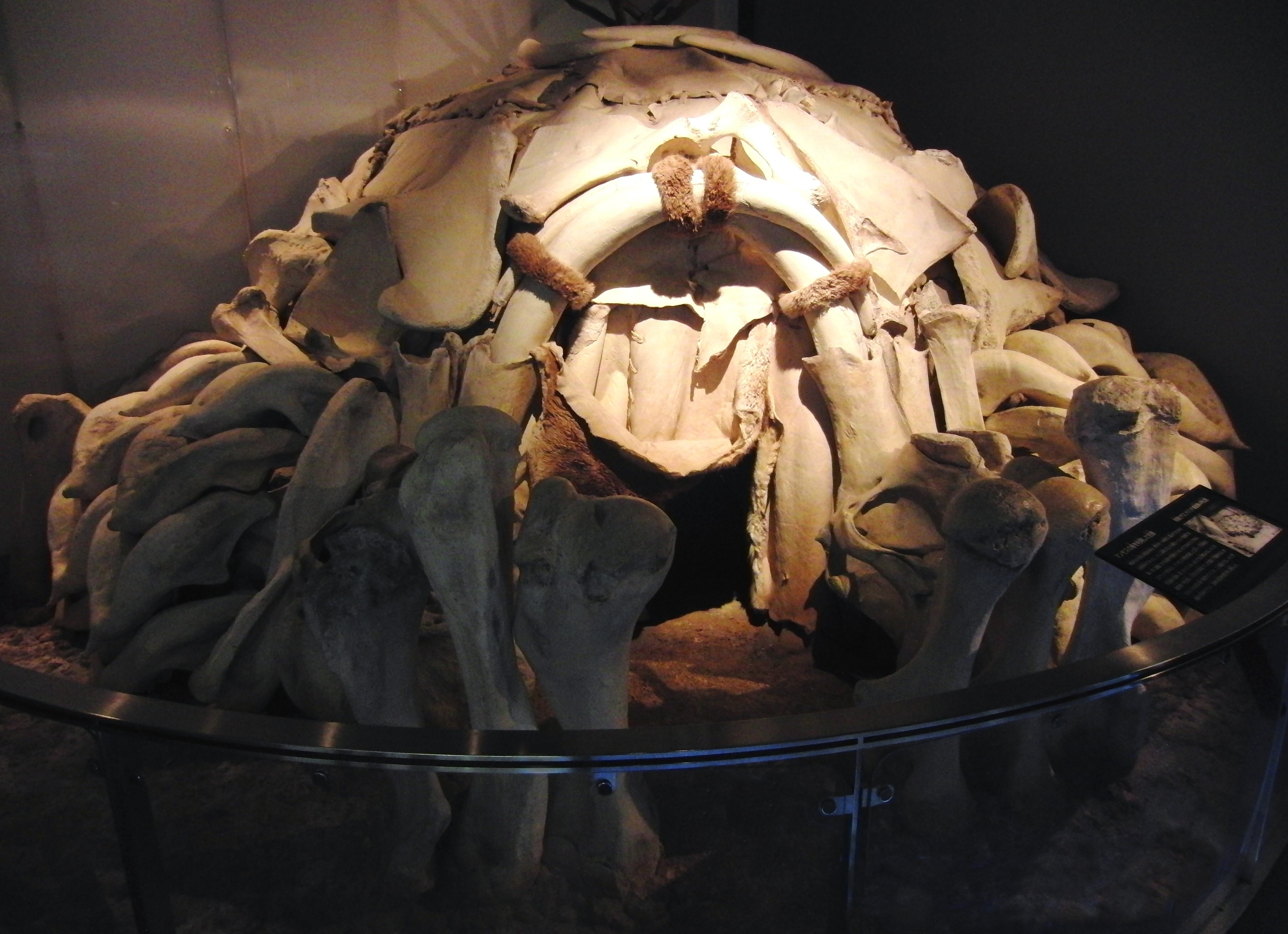
Mammoth bone dwelling, Mezhirich site, Ukraine

The dog is a classic example of a domestic animal that likely traveled a commensal pathway into domestication. The dog was the first domesticant, and was domesticated and widely established across Eurasia before the end of the Pleistocene, well before cultivation or the domestication of other animals. It may have been inevitable that the first domesticated animal came from the order of carnivores as these are less afraid when approaching other species. Within the carnivores, the first domesticated animal would need to exist without an all-meat diet, possess a running and hunting ability to provide its own food, and be of a controllable size to coexist with humans, indicating the family Canidae, and the right temperament with wolves being among the most gregarious and cooperative animals on the planet.

==== Human campfire theory ====
Ancient DNA supports the hypothesis that dog domestication preceded the emergence of agriculture and was initiated close to the Last Glacial Maximum when hunter-gatherers preyed on megafauna, and when proto-dogs might have taken advantage of carcasses left on site by early hunters, assisted in the capture of prey, or provided defense from large competing predators at kill-sites. Wolves were probably attracted to human campfires by the smell of meat being cooked and discarded refuse in the vicinity, first loosely attaching themselves and then considering these as part of their home territory where their warning growls would alert humans to the approach of outsiders. The wolves most likely drawn to human camps were the less-aggressive, subdominant pack members with lowered flight response, higher stress thresholds and less wary around humans, which was the start of a process known as self-domestication, making them better candidates for further domestication.

==== Migratory wolves theory ====
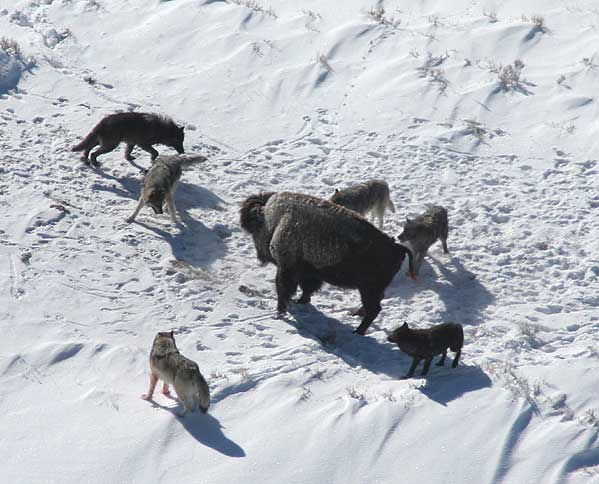
Bison surrounded by grey wolf pack

On the mammoth steppe the wolf's ability to hunt in packs, to share risk fairly among pack members, and to cooperate moved them to the top of the food chain above lions, hyenas and bears. Some wolves followed the great reindeer herds, eliminating the unfit, the weaklings, the sick and the aged, and therefore improved the herd. These wolves had become the first pastoralists hundreds of thousands of years before humans also took to this role. The wolves' advantage over their competitors was that they were able to keep pace with the herds, move fast and enduringly, and make the most efficient use of their kill by their ability to eat a large part of their quarry before other predators had detected the kill. One study proposed that during the Last Glacial Maximum, some humans teamed up with those pastoralist wolves and learned their techniques.

Many early humans remained gatherers and scavengers, or specialized as fish-hunters, hunter-gatherers, and hunter-gardeners. However, some adopted the pastoralist wolves' lifestyle as herd followers and herders of reindeer, horses, and other hoofed animals. They harvested the best stock for themselves while the wolves kept the herd strong, and this group of humans was to become the first herders and this group of wolves was to become the first dogs.

The remains of large carcasses left by human hunter-gatherers may have led some wolves into entering a migratory relationship with humans. This could have led to their divergence from those wolves that remained in the one territory. A closer relationship between these wolves – or proto-dogs – and humans may have then developed, such as hunting together and mutual defence from other carnivores and other humans. A maternal mDNA, paternal yDNA, and microsatellite assessment of two wolf populations in North America and combined with satellite telemetry data revealed significant genetic and morphological differences between one population that migrated with and preyed upon caribou, and another territorial ecotype population that remained in a boreal coniferous forest. Though these two populations spend a period of the year in the same place, and though there was evidence of gene flow between them, the difference in prey–habitat specialization has been sufficient to maintain genetic and even colouration divergence. A study has identified the remains of a population of extinct Pleistocene Beringian wolves with unique mDNA signatures. The skull shape, tooth wear, and isotopic signatures suggested these were specialist megafauna hunters and scavengers that became extinct while less specialized wolf ecotypes survived. Analogous to the modern wolf ecotype that has evolved to track and prey upon caribou, a Pleistocene wolf population could have begun following mobile hunter-gatherers, thus slowly acquiring genetic and phenotypic differences that would have allowed them to more successfully adapt to the human habitat.

==== Food partitioning theory ====
Dogs were the only animal to be domesticated by mobile hunter-gatherers. Humans and wolves were both persistent pack hunters of large prey, were competing in overlapping territory, and are both capable of killing each other. One study proposes how humans may have domesticated such a dangerous competitor. Humans and wolves are members of the large carnivore guild, and when there is abundant game the top members leave carcasses for the other members to scavenge. When game is scarce there is often conflict. Humans are unusual members of this guild because they are primates, therefore their ability to process meat is limited by the capacity of the liver to metabolize protein, and they can derive only 20% of their energy requirements from protein. High protein consumption in humans can lead to illness.

During the harsh winters of the Last Glacial Maximum plant foods would have not been available, and meat would not be the favoured food but fat and grease would be, as is prized by some high-latitude dwelling peoples in modern times. Game meat would have been devoid of fat, but the limbs and crania contain fat deposits, and limb bones contain fatty oils. There is evidence of such processing during this period. Wolves are typical carnivores and can survive on a protein-based diet for months. Calculations of the lipid content of arctic and subarctic game available across the cold steppe environment at this time and today shows that in order to gain the necessary quantity of fat and oils, there would have been enough excess animal calories to feed either proto-dogs or wolves with no need for competition. Hunting together and protection from other predators would have been advantageous to both species, leading to domestication.

=== Genetic changes ===
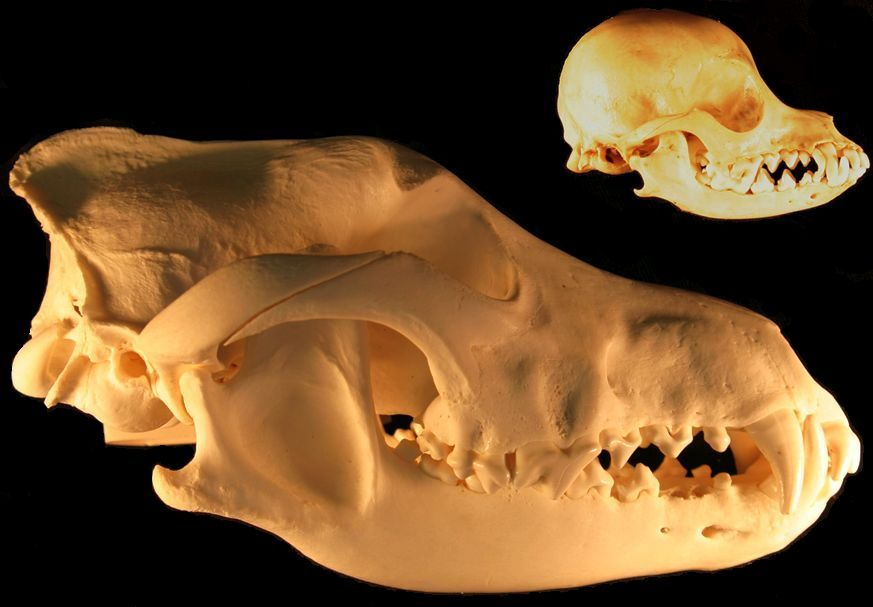
Reduction in size under selective breeding – grey wolf and chihuahua skulls

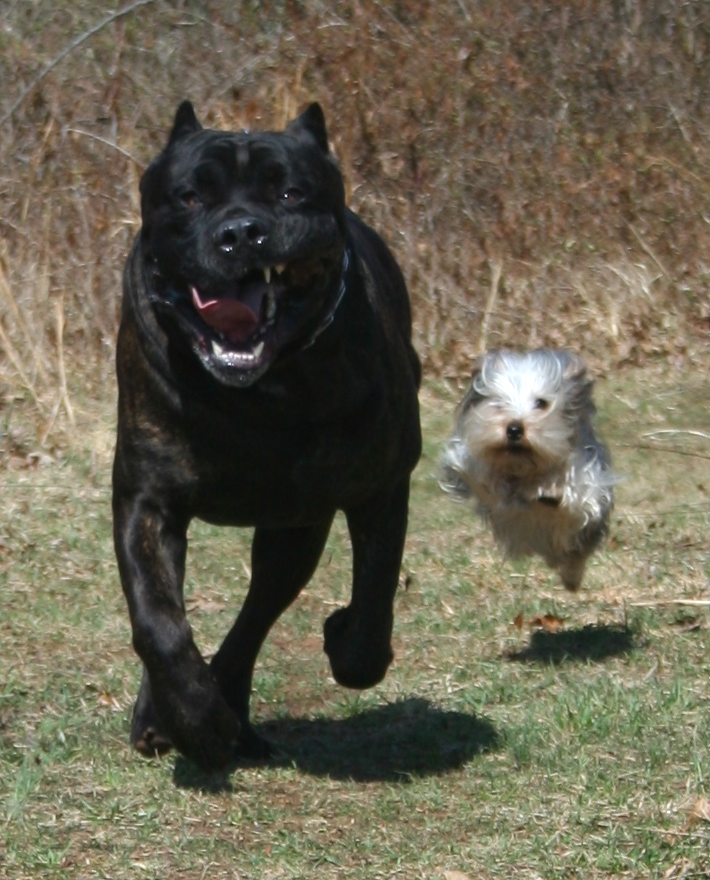
The difference in overall body size between a Cane Corso (Italian mastiff) and a Yorkshire Terrier is over 30-fold, yet both are members of the same species.

==== The yellow dog study ====
Domestic dogs exhibit diverse coat colours and patterns. In many mammals, different colour patterns are the result of the regulation of the Agouti gene, which can cause hair follicles to switch from making black or brown pigments to yellow or nearly white pigments. The most common coat pattern found in modern wolves is agouti, in which the upperside of the body has banded hairs and the underside exhibits lighter shading. The colour yellow is dominant to the colour black and is found in dogs across much of the world and the dingo in Australia.

In 2021, a study of whole genome sequences taken from dogs and wolves focused on the genetic relationships between them based on coat colour. The study found that most dog colour haplotypes were similar to most wolf haplotypes, however dominant yellow in dogs was closely related to white in arctic wolves from North America. This result suggests a common origin for dominant yellow in dogs and white in wolves but without recent gene flow, because this light colour clade was found to be basal to the golden jackal and genetically distinct from all other canids. The most recent common ancestor of the golden jackal and the wolf lineage dates back to 2 million YBP. The study proposes that 35,000 YBP there was genetic introgression into the Late Pleistocene grey wolf from a ghost population of an extinct canid which had diverged from the grey wolf lineage over 2 million YBP. This colour diversity could be found 35,000 YBP in wolves and 9,500 YBP in dogs. A closely related haplotype exists among those wolves of Tibet which possess yellow shading in their coats. The study explains the colour relationships between modern dogs and wolves, white wolves from North America, yellow dogs, and yellowish wolves from Tibet. The study concludes that during the Late Pleistocene, natural selection laid the genetic foundation for modern coat colour diversity in dogs and wolves.

==== Dietary adaptation ====
Selection appears to have acted on the dog's metabolic functions to cope with changes in dietary fat, followed later with a dietary increase in starch associated with a more commensal lifestyle.

The dog genome compared to the wolf genome shows signs of having undergone positive selection; these include genes relating to brain function and behaviour, and to lipid metabolism. This ability to process lipids indicates a dietary target of selection that was important when proto-dogs hunted and fed alongside hunter-gatherers. The evolution of the dietary metabolism genes may have helped process the increased lipid content of early dog diets as they scavenged on the remains of carcasses left by hunter-gatherers. Prey capture rates may have increased in comparison to wolves and with it the amount of lipid consumed by the assisting proto-dogs. A unique dietary selection pressure may have evolved both from the amount consumed and the shifting composition of tissues that were available to proto-dogs once humans had removed the most desirable parts of the carcass for themselves. A study of the mammal biomass during modern human expansion into the northern Mammoth steppe found that it had occurred under conditions of unlimited resources, and that many of the animals were killed with only a small part consumed or were left unused.

==== Behaviour ====
The key phase in domestication appears to have been changes in social behaviour and its corresponding oxytocin receptor genes and neural-related genes. Behaviour differences between dogs and wolves may be contributed by structural variation in the genes that are associated with human Williams-Beuren syndrome. This syndrome causes increased hyper-sociability, which may have been important during domestication.

In 2014, a whole genome study of the DNA differences between wolves and dogs found that the dogs' tameness was not a reduced fear response but did show greater synaptic plasticity. Synaptic plasticity is widely believed to be the cellular correlate of learning and memory. The study proposes that the improved learning and memory abilities of dogs also helped to lower their level of fear around humans.

Unlike other domestic species which were primarily selected for production-related traits, dogs were initially selected for their behaviours. In 2016, a study found that there were only 11 fixed genes that showed variation between wolves and dogs. These gene variations were unlikely to have been the result of natural evolution, and indicate selection on both morphology and behaviour during dog domestication. There was evidence of selection during dog domestication of genes that affect the adrenaline and noradrenaline biosynthesis pathway. These genes are involved in the synthesis, transport and degradation of a variety of neurotransmitters, particularly the catecholamines, which include dopamine and noradrenaline. Recurrent selection on this pathway and its role in emotional processing and the fight-or-flight response suggests that the behavioural changes we see in dogs compared to wolves may be due to changes in this pathway, leading to tameness and an emotional processing ability. Dogs generally show reduced fear and aggression compared to wolves. Some of these genes have been associated with aggression in some dog breeds, indicating their importance in both the initial domestication and then later in breed formation.

==== Role of epigenetics ====
Differences in hormonal expression that are associated with domestication syndrome may be linked to epigenetic modifications. A recent study that compared the methylation patterns of dogs with those of wolves found 68 significantly different methylated sites. These included sites which are linked to two neurotransmitter genes associated with cognition. There is a direct association between the dog's social behaviour and OXTR, which is a receptor for the neurotransmitter oxytocin, and this has been caused through the epigenetic methylation of the OXTR gene. DNA methylation differences have been found between wolves and dogs, and between different dog breeds. This implies that epigenetic factors may have been important for both dog domestication and the divergence of dog breeds.

Similar to humans, wolves show strong social and emotional bonds within their groupings, and this relationship might have been the foundation for the evolution of dog-human bonding. In 2019, a literature review led to a new theory named Active Social Domestication, in which the social environment of the dog ancestor induced neuro-physiological changes that caused an epigenetic cascade, which led to the rapid development of domestication syndrome.

=== Dog and human coevolution ===
==== Parallel evolution ====
Being the first domesticated species by humans has created a strong bond between dogs and humans and entwined their histories. Dogs accompanied humans when they first migrated into new environments and show similar adaptations – such as to high altitude, low oxygen conditions.

There is an extensive list of genes showing signatures of parallel evolution in dogs and humans. This has led to the study of the coevolution of gene function. 311 genes under positive selection in dogs are related to a large number of overlapping loci which show the same patterns in humans. These genes are involved in traits ranging from digestion and neurological processes to some cancers. For example, it has been inferred from genes which act on the serotonergic system in the brain that coevolution has led to less aggressive behaviour when living in crowded environments.

Dogs also suffer from many of the same common diseases as humans – including cancer, diabetes, heart disease, and neurological disorders. The underlying disease pathologies are similar to those in humans, as are their responses to treatment and resultant outcomes.

==== Behavioural evidence ====
Convergent evolution is when distantly related species independently evolve similar solutions to the same problem. For example, penguins and dolphins have each separately evolved flippers as a solution to the problem of moving through the water. What has been found between dogs and humans is something less frequently demonstrated: psychological convergence. Dogs have independently evolved to be cognitively more similar to humans than we are to our closest genetic relatives. Dogs have evolved specialized skills for reading human social and communicative behaviour. These skills seem more flexible – and possibly more human-like – than those of other animals more closely related to humans phylogenetically, such as chimpanzees, bonobos and other great apes. This raises the possibility that convergent evolution has occurred: both Canis familiaris and Homo sapiens might have evolved some similar (although obviously not identical) social-communicative skills – in both cases adapted for certain kinds of social and communicative interactions with human beings.

Studies support coevolution in that dogs can follow the human pointing gesture, discriminate the emotional expressions of human faces, and that most people can tell from a bark whether a dog is alone, being approached by a stranger, playing, or being aggressive, and can tell from a growl how big the dog is.

In 2015, a study found that when dogs and their owners interact, extended eye contact (mutual gaze) increases oxytocin levels in both the dog and its owner. As oxytocin is known for its role in maternal bonding, it is considered likely that this effect has supported the coevolution of human–dog bonding.

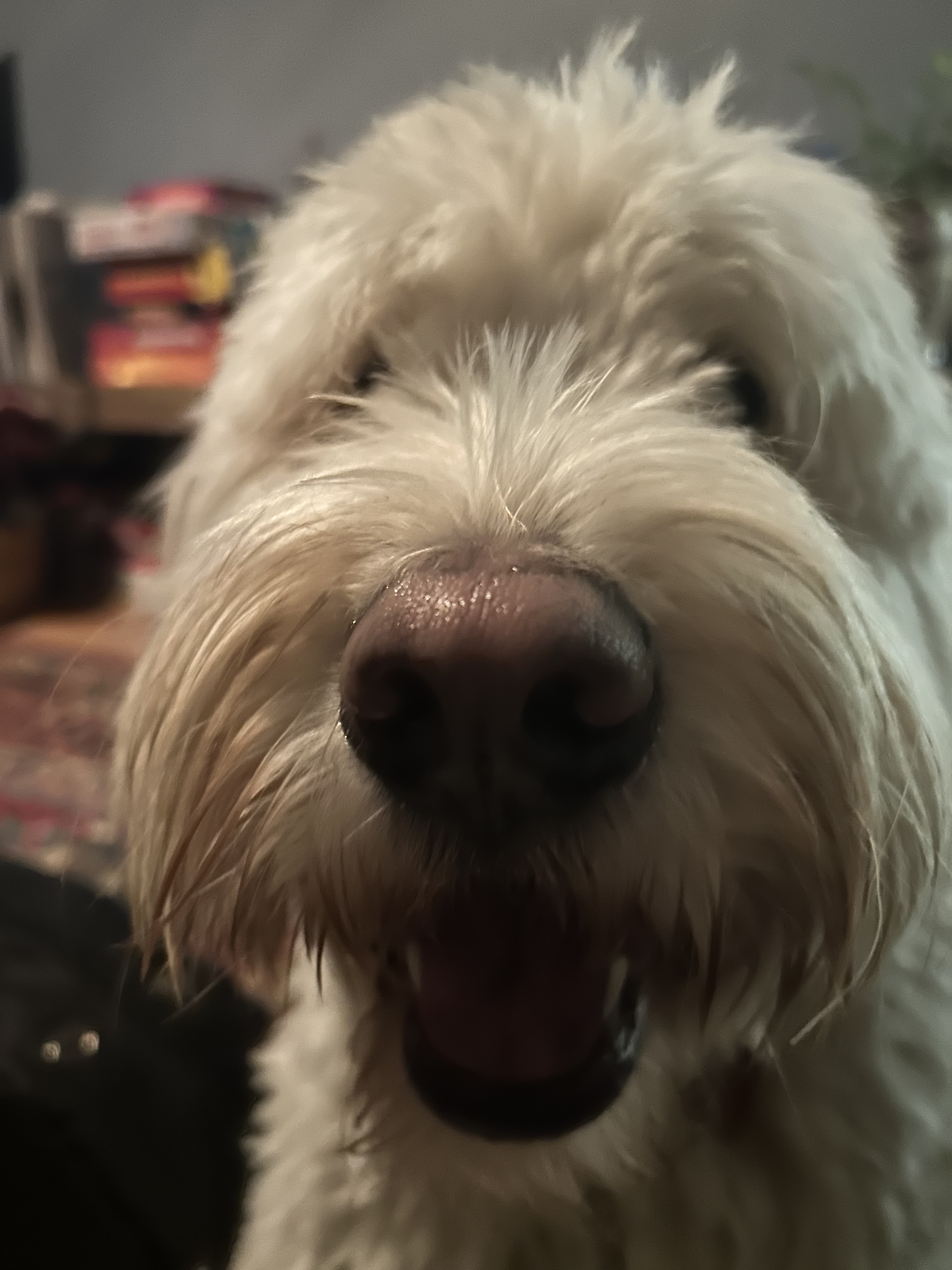
Example of a dog making prolonged eye contact with a human

The dog could have arisen only from animals predisposed to human society by lack of fear, attentiveness, curiosity, necessity, and recognition of advantage gained through collaboration. ... the humans and wolves involved in the conversion were sentient, observant beings constantly making decisions about how they lived and what they did, based on the perceived ability to obtain at a given time and place what they needed to survive and thrive. They were social animals willing, even eager, to join forces with another animal to merge their sense of group with the others' sense and create an expanded super-group that was beneficial to both in multiple ways. They were individual animals and people involved, from our perspective, in a biological and cultural process that involved linking not only their lives but the evolutionary fate of their heirs in ways, we must assume, they could never have imagined. Powerful emotions were in play that many observers today refer to as love – boundless, unquestioning love.

— Mark Derr

==== Human adoption of some wolf behaviours ====
Isn't it strange that, our being such an intelligent primate, we didn't domesticate chimpanzees as companions instead? Why did we choose wolves even though they are strong enough to maim or kill us?

— Wolfgang Schleidt

In 2002, a study proposed that immediate human ancestors and wolves may have domesticated each other through a strategic alliance that would change both respectively into humans and dogs. The effects of human psychology, hunting practices, territoriality, and social behaviour would have been profound.

Early humans moved from scavenging and small-game hunting to big-game hunting by living in larger, socially more-complex groups, learning to hunt in packs, and developing powers of cooperation and negotiation in complex situations. As these are characteristics of wolves, dogs and humans, it can be argued that these behaviours were enhanced once wolves and humans began to cohabit. Communal hunting led to communal defense. Wolves actively patrol and defend their scent-marked territory, and perhaps humans had their sense of territoriality enhanced by living with wolves. One of the keys to recent human survival has been the forming of partnerships. Strong bonds exist between same-sex wolves, dogs and humans, and these bonds are stronger than exist between other same-sex animal pairs. Today, the most widespread form of inter-species bonding occurs between humans and dogs. The concept of friendship has ancient origins, but it may have been enhanced through the inter-species relationship to give a survival advantage.

In 2003, a study compared the behaviour and ethics of chimpanzees, wolves and humans. Cooperation among humans' closest genetic relative is limited to occasional hunting episodes or the persecution of a competitor for personal advantage, which had to be tempered if humans were to become domesticated. One might therefore argue that the closest approximation to human morality that can be found in nature is that of the grey wolf. Wolves are among the most gregarious and cooperative of animals on the planet, and their ability to cooperate in well-coordinated drives to hunt prey, carry items too heavy for an individual, provisioning not only their own young but also the other pack members, babysitting etc. are rivaled only by that of human societies. Similar forms of cooperation are observed in two closely related canids, the African wild dog and the Asian dhole, therefore it is reasonable to assume that canid sociality and cooperation are old traits that in terms of evolution predate human sociality and cooperation. Today's wolves may even be less social than their ancestors, as they have lost access to large herds of ungulates and now tend more toward a lifestyle similar to coyotes, jackals, and even foxes. Social sharing within families may be a trait that early humans learned from wolves, and, with wolves digging dens long before humans constructed huts, it is not clear who domesticated whom.

== First dogs ==
=== Dogs domesticated in East Asia ===
Savolainen looking at mitochondrial DNA shows that an initial phase of dog domestication began in China or Southeast Asia 33,000 years ago, and a second phase 18,000 years later in which the dog migrated out of Southeast Asia towards Africa and the Middle East. Arriving in Europe, around 10,000 years ago, giving rise to modern dog breeds.

Savolainen pointed out that many studies that contradicted the origin of dog domestication from China or elsewhere in Southeast Asia, did not include wolf or dog samples from China or Southeast Asia.

=== Dogs domesticated in Siberia 23,000 years ago ===
Locating the origin of dogs is made difficult by the lack of data on extinct Pleistocene wolves, the small morphological changes that occurred between wild and domestic populations during the first phases of domestication, and the lack of an accompanying human material culture at this time.

In 2016, a genetic study found that ancient and modern dogs fall into an Eastern Eurasian clade and a Western Eurasian clade. In 2017, another genetic study found evidence of a single dog-wolf divergence occurring between 36,900 and 41,500 YBP, followed by a divergence between Eastern Eurasian and Western Eurasian dogs 17,500–23,900 YBP and this indicates a single dog domestication event occurring between 20,000 and 40,000 YBP.

In 2021, a review of the current evidence indicates from the timings provided by DNA studies that the dog was domesticated in Siberia 23,000 years ago by ancient North Siberians. The dog later dispersed from Siberia with the migration of peoples eastwards into the Americas and westwards across Eurasia. The ancient North Siberians were once a people whose ancestors archaeological remains have been found at the Paleolithic Yana RHS (Rhinoceros Horn Site) on the Yana River delta in arctic northern Siberia that is dated 31,600 YBP, and at the Mal'ta site near Lake Baikal in southern Siberia just north of Mongolia that is dated 24,000 YBP. Ancient dog remains dating to this time and place have yet to be discovered to support this hypothesis.

The review theorizes that the harsh climate of the Last Glacial Maximum may have brought humans and wolves closer together while they were isolated inside refuge areas. Both species hunt the same prey, and their increased interactions may have resulted in the shared scavenging of kills, wolves drawn to human campsites, a shift in their relationship, and eventually domestication.

Mitochondrial DNA indicates that almost all modern dogs fall into one of four monophyletic haplogroups which are named haplogroups A, B, C, and D. The majority of dogs fall within haplogroup A. The mDNA "molecular clock" indicates that 22,800 YBP the first genetic divergence (split) occurred in haplogroup A, resulting in the lineages A1b and A2. This timing is the oldest known between any two dog mDNA lineages. As humans migrated across Siberia, through Beringia, and down through the Americas, archaeological remains indicate that their mDNA lineages diverged several times. Based on these timings, and the timings of several dog divergences found from early dog remains across these regions, it was discovered that there was a correlation between human and dog migrations and population divergences. This correlation suggests that where people went, their dogs also went. Tracing back through these human and dog lineages and timings led to the inference that the dog was first domesticated in Siberia nearly 23,000 YBP by North Siberians.

Another study undertook an analysis of the complete mitogenome sequences of 555 modern and ancient dogs. The sequences showed an increase in the population size approximately 23,500 YBP, which broadly coincides with the proposed genetic divergence of the ancestors of dogs from modern wolves. A ten-fold increase in the population size occurred after 15,000 YBP, which is consistent with the demographic dependence of dogs on the human population.

Earlier in 2018, a study proposes that the Yana site showed evidence of wolf pre-domestication. There are remains of medium-sized canids found there that could not be referred to as dogs, however they showed indications of living with people. These included worn and partially missing teeth, and the skull of an almost-adult showing juvenile features. The morphologic and morphometric anomalies in the specimens indicate commensalism and the earliest stage of domestication.

=== Admixture ===
Studies indicate admixture between the dog-wolf ancestor and golden jackals. However, since domestication, there was almost negligible gene flow from wolves into dogs but substantial gene flow from dogs into wolves. There were some wolves that were related to all ancient and modern dogs. A very small amount of gene flow was detected between coyotes and ancient American dogs, and between the African wolf and African dogs but in which direction could not be determined. The short divergence time between dogs and wolves followed by their continuous admixture has led to 20% of the genome of East Asian wolves and 7–25% of the genome of European and Middle Eastern wolves showing contributions from dogs. The β-defensin gene responsible for the black coat of North American wolves was the result of a single introgression from early Native American dogs in the Yukon between 1,600 and 7,200 YBP. Dogs and wolves living in the Himalayas and on the Tibetan Plateau carry the EPAS1 allele that is associated with high-altitude oxygen adaptation, which has been contributed by a ghost population of an unknown wolf-like canid. This ghost population is deeply diverged from modern Holarctic wolves and dogs, and has contributed 39% to the Himalayan wolf's nuclear genome. Limited gene flow has likely occurred in arctic dogs.

=== Magdalenian dogs ===
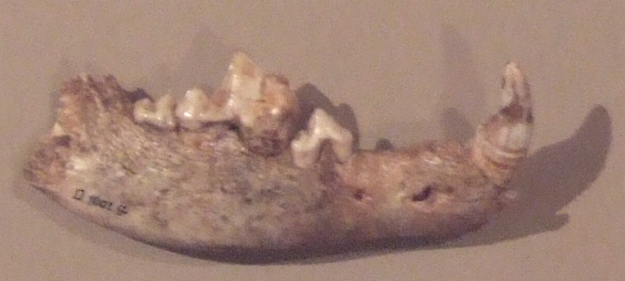
Mandible of the Bonn–Oberkassel dog from the oldest dog-human co-burial dated 14,200 years old

In 1914, the earliest discovery of a Palaeolithic dog-human co-burial was made in a Magdalenian archaeological site called Bonn-Oberkassel, Germany. Contextual, isotopic, genetic, and morphological evidence shows that this dog was clearly not a local wolf. The dog was dated to 14,223 YBP. Since then, many other dog remains from the Magdalenian and the Azilian cultures have been found. Among these, some directly dated clearly identified dog remains are older than the Bonn–Oberkassel dog: Erralla (Spain), 17,410–17,096 YBP; Abri le Morin (France), 15,132–14,155 YBP. Other Magdalenian and Azilian remains are: Hauterive-Champréveyres, Le Closeau, Anton Koba, Kesslerloch, Grotte-abri du Moulin, Pont d'Ambon, and Kartstein.

The humerus of the Erralla dog, now recognized as that of the most ancient undoubtedly identified dog in the world, was found in 1985 by Basque zooarchaeologist Jesús Altuna Etxabe. He identified it as not being a wolf due to its size, extremely small for a wolf. However, its identification as a dog could not be ascertained until another Pleistocene canid inhabiting the Iberian Peninsula was clearly discarded, the Cuon. The genotyping of the humerus of the Erralla dog as that of a Canis belonging to the dog mitochondrial haplogroup C, and its morphometric study, ascertained that the humerus of the Erralla dog is that of a dog, and not a wolf or a dhole. Erralla dog belonged to an archaeological level of the Magdalenian culture in Erralla site (Gipuzkoa, Basque Country, Spain). Magdalenian culture expanded from the Franco-Cantabrian region glacial refugee (North Spain, South France) to the rest of Western Europe after the Last Glacial Maximum (LGM). During this process, Magdalenian hunter-gatherers probably brought their dogs with them, as all the Palaeolithic dogs from Paleolithic Western Europe, including the Bonn–Oberkassel dog, share the mitochondrial haplogroup C with the Erralla dog. This archaeological and palaeogenetic evidence points to the special role of the LGM in dog domestication.

Regarding Bonn-Oberkassel dog, in 1914, on the eve of the First World War, two human skeletons were discovered during basalt quarrying at Oberkassel, Bonn in Germany. With them were found a right mandible of a "wolf" and other animal bones. After the end of the First World War, in 1919 a full study was made of these remains. The mandible was recorded as "Canis lupus, the wolf" and some of the other animal bones were assigned to it. The remains were then stored and forgotten for fifty years. In the late 1970s there was renewed interest in the Oberkassel remains and the mandible was re-examined and reclassified as belonging to a domesticated dog. The mitochondrial DNA sequence of the mandible was matched to Canis familiaris – a dog – and falls within mDNA haplogroup C of dogs. The bodies were dated to 14,223 YBP. This implies that in Western Europe there were morphologically and genetically "modern" dogs in existence around 14,500 YBP.

Later studies assigned more of the other animal bones to the dog until most of a skeleton could be assembled. The humans were a man aged 40 years and a woman aged 25 years. All three skeletal remains were found sprayed with red hematite powder and covered with large 20 cm thick basalt blocks. The consensus is that a dog was buried along with two humans. A tooth belonging to a smaller and older dog was also identified but it had not been sprayed with red powder. The cause of the death of the two humans is not known. A pathology study of the dog remains suggests that it had died young after suffering from canine distemper between ages 19 and 23 weeks. The dog could not have survived during this period without intensive human care. During this period the dog was of no utilitarian use to humans, and suggests the existence of emotional or symbolic ties between these humans and this dog. In conclusion, near the end of the Late Pleistocene at least some humans regarded dogs not just materialistically, but had developed emotional and caring bonds for their dogs.

=== Ice Age dogs ===
In 2020, the sequencing of ancient dog genomes indicates that dogs share a common ancestry and descended from an ancient, now-extinct wolf population – or closely related wolf populations – which was distinct from the modern wolf lineage. By the close of the last Ice Age (11,700 YBP), five ancestral lineages had diversified from each other and were expressed in dog samples taken from the Neolithic era Levant (7,000 YBP), Mesolithic era Karelia (10,900 YBP), Mesolithic era Baikal (7,000 YBP), ancient America (4,000 YBP), and the New Guinea singing dog (present day).

The world's ancient and modern dog population structure can be classified into Arctic/Americas, East Asian, and West Eurasian. The Arctic/Americas lineage includes modern arctic breeds, a 9,500 YBP dog from Zhokhov Island, ancient pre-European contact American dogs, mid-Holocene dogs from Lake Baikal, historical dogs from across Siberia, and dogs from the Yamalo-Nenets Autonomous Okrug region in northwestern Siberia. The East Asian lineage includes modern dogs from China, Vietnam, Island South East Asia, and the dingo and the New Guinea singing dog that represent unadmixed East Asian ancestry. The West Eurasian lineage includes ancient Levantine and ancient Near Eastern dogs, ancient and modern European dogs, modern African dogs, and Bronze Age dogs from the Eurasian Steppe.

Ancient and modern European dogs have a closer relationship with arctic dogs than do Near Eastern dogs, indicating a major admixture event in Europe. Analyses of a recently sequenced genome from the Mesolithic site of Veretye, Karelia (~10,000 YBP) in Northeast Europe recapitulate findings that show these dogs possessed ancestry related to both Arctic (~70%) and Western Eurasian (~30%) lineages. This suggests that other modern and ancient (post-Mesolithic) European dogs sequenced to date, Mesolithic dogs in Europe already possessed both Arctic and Western Eurasian ancestry. The fact that the ancient Siberian dog from Zhokhov Island, dated ~1,000 years after the Veretye, Karelia dogs, possesses no Western Eurasian ancestry, indicates that Western dog ancestry had not yet reached the Siberian Arctic by 9,500 YBP. The 9,500 YBP Zhokhov dog is more closely related to a 6,000 YBP dog from Lake Baikal than related to the ancient dogs found in North America, which supports that a genetic split had occurred between the early Arctic and North American dogs and that their common ancestor dates much older than the 9,500 YBP Zhokhov dog The earliest Neolithic European dog dated 7,000 YBP was found to be a mixture of the Karelian and the Levantine lineages. The lineage of a Neolithic dog dated 5,000 YBP found in southwestern Sweden was the ancestor of 90-100% of modern European dogs. This implies that in Europe a population of half-Karelian and half-Levantine dogs similar to this one – but not necessarily originating in Sweden – replaced all of the other dog populations. These findings together support a dual ancestry for modern European dogs, which possess 54% Karelian and 46% Levantine ancestries.

Siberian dogs were genetically similar 9,500–7,000 YBP showing Arctic ancestry, however the introduction of dogs from the Eurasian Steppe and Europe led to substantial genetic admixture, with ancient and historical Siberian dogs exhibiting varying levels of Arctic and Near East ancestry. Dogs from the Bronze Age Eurasian Steppe exhibited 40% ancient arctic and 60% ancient Near East ancestry until the Middle Ages. This implies that dogs migrated as part of the Neolithic expansion of farming from the Near East into the steppes. In the Yamalo-Nenets Autonomous Okrug region in northwestern Siberia, dogs from 2,000 YBP were less related to the dogs of the Eurasian Steppe and Europe than dogs 1,000 YBP. The archaeological presence of glass beads and metal items indicate that this region was connected to a large trade network which included the Near East, the Black Sea region, and the Eurasian Steppe which led to the acquiring of dogs from these regions. The acquisition of dogs from the Near East adapted to farming, and the Eurasian Steppe adapted to pastoralism, may have provided behavioural and morphological characteristics when admixed with Arctic dogs, leading to their adaptation from foraging to reindeer pastoralism. Two dog specimens that are nearly 100 years old and obtained from the Nenets people on the Yamal Peninsula found that these are related to two specimens dated 2,000 years old and 850 years old, which suggests continuity of the lineage in this region. The two 100 year old dogs were closely related with the Samoyed breed. Siberian Huskies show a genetic affinity with historical East Siberian dogs and ancient Lake Baikal dogs. Together, this indicates that the ancient arctic lineage lives on in some modern Siberian breeds.

Ancient dog genomes were compared with ancient human genomes across time, space, and cultural context to reveal that these generally matched each other. These generally share similar features but they differ across time. There were some large differences: the same dogs could be found in both the Neolithic Levant and later in Chalcolithic Iran (5,800 YBP) although the human populations of each were different; in Neolithic Ireland (4,800 YBP) and Germany (7,000 YBP) the dogs are more associated with northern European hunter-gatherers while the humans were more associated with people from the Levant; and on the Bronze Age Pontic–Caspian steppe (3,800 YBP) and in Corded Ware culture Germany (4,700 YBP) the human population had shifted away from the Neolithic European populations but the dogs had not. European dogs have a stronger genetic relationship to Siberian and ancient American dogs than to the New Guinea singing dog, which has an East Asian origin, reflecting an early polar relationship between humans in the Americas and Europe. People living in the Lake Baikal region 18,000–24,000 YBP were genetically related to western Eurasians and contributed to the ancestry of Native Americans, however these were then replaced by other populations. Ten thousand years later, around 7,000 YBP, the dogs in the Lake Baikal region still exhibited a relationship with Europe and the Americas. This implies that there was a shared population structure for both dogs and humans across circumpolar northern Eurasia.

Ancient human genomes show a major ancestry transformation which coincided with the expansion of Neolithic farmers from the Near East into Europe. Ancient dog mitochondria suggests these were accompanied by dogs, which led to an associated ancestry transformation for dogs in Europe. The expansions of steppe pastoralists associated with the Corded Ware culture and the Yamnaya culture into Late Neolithic and Bronze Age Europe transformed the ancestry of human populations but their accompanying dogs had no major impact on European dog populations. The steppe pastoralists also expanded eastwards but had little impact on the ancestry of East Asian people. However, many Chinese dogs appear to be a product of admixture between the lineage of a 3,800 YBP western Eurasian Srubnaya culture dog and the ancestor of the dingo and New Guinea singing dog. Populations of modern Siberian dogs also show ancestry from 7,000 YBP Lake Baikal dogs but little or no New Guinea singing dog ancestry, indicating no East Asian ancestry.

The AMY2B gene codes a protein which assists with the first step in the digestion of dietary starch and glycogen. An expansion of this gene would enable early dogs to exploit a starch-rich diet. At the beginning of agriculture, only some dogs possessed this adaptation which became widespread several thousand years later.

Dogs migrated alongside humans but the movement of the two did not always align, indicating that in some cases humans migrated without dogs or that dogs moved between human groups, possibly as a cultural or trade item. Dogs appear to have been dispersed across Eurasia and into the Americas without any major human population movement being involved, which remains a mystery. Past studies have suggested the dog's place of origin but these studies were based upon today's patterns of genomic diversity or possible links to modern wolf populations. The dog's history was obscured to these studies because of recent gene flow and population dynamics – the geographical origin of the dog remains unknown.

=== First dogs as a hunting technology ===
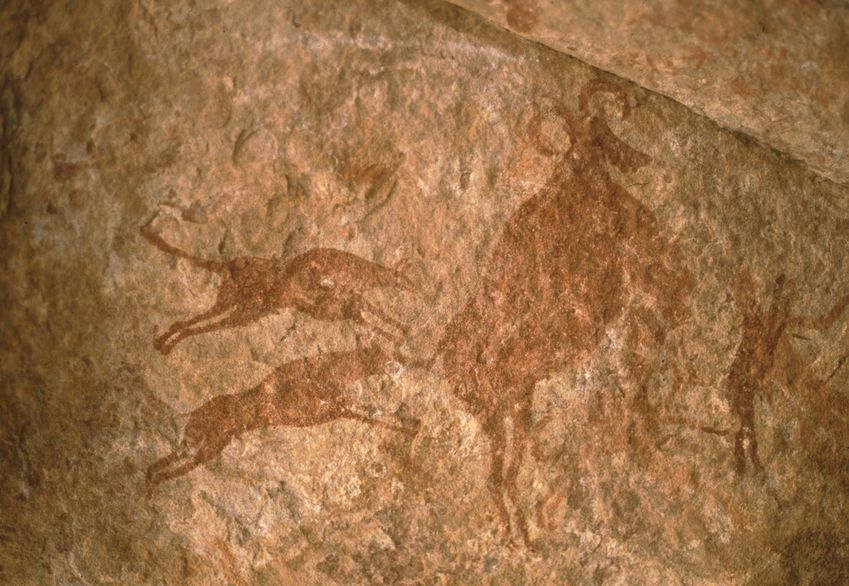
Petroglyph depicting two dogs hunting – Tassili n'Ajjer, Algeria

During the Upper Paleolithic (50,000–10,000 YBP), the increase in human population density, advances in blade and hunting technology, and climate change may have altered prey densities and made scavenging crucial to the survival of some wolf populations. Adaptations to scavenging such as tameness, small body size, and a decreased age of reproduction would reduce their hunting efficiency further, eventually leading to obligated scavenging. Whether these earliest dogs were simply human-commensal scavengers or they played some role as companions or hunters that hastened their spread is unknown.

Researchers have proposed that in the past a hunting partnership existed between humans and dogs that was the basis for dog domestication. Petroglyph rock art dating to 8,000 YBP at the sites of Shuwaymis and Jubbah, in northwestern Saudi Arabia, depict large numbers of dogs participating in hunting scenes with some being controlled on a leash. The transition from the Late Pleistocene into the early Holocene was marked by climatic change from cold and dry to warmer, wetter conditions and rapid shifts in flora and fauna, with much of the open habitat of large herbivores being replaced by forests. In the early Holocene, it is proposed that along with changes in arrow-head technology that hunting dogs were used by hunters to track and retrieve wounded game in thick forests. The dog's ability to chase, track, sniff out and hold prey can significantly increase the success of hunters in forests, where human senses and location skills are not as sharp as in more open habitats. Dogs are still used for hunting in forests today.

=== Arctic breeds ===
==== First dog breeds developed in arctic northeastern Siberia ====
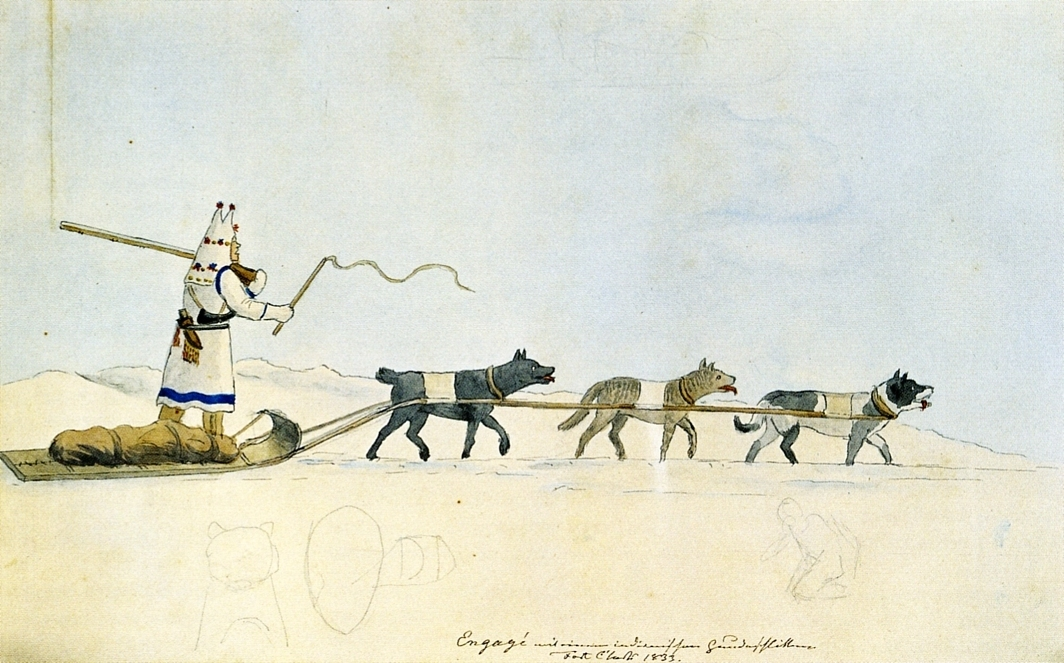
Sled dog types, sketched in 1833

The domestic dog was present 9,500 YBP on what is now Zhokhov Island, arctic northeastern Siberia. The archaeological discoveries at the Zhokhov site includes the remains of dog harness straps similar to those used by the modern Inuit, the bone remains of polar bears and reindeer which suggests a wide hunting range and the transport of large body parts back to the site, and tools made from obsidian transported from 1,500 kilometres away. These findings suggest long-distance transport through the use of sled dogs.

A study of dog remains indicates that these were selectively bred to be either as sled dogs or as hunting dogs, which implies that a sled dog standard and a hunting dog standard existed at that time. The optimal maximum size for a sled dog is 20–25 kg based on thermo-regulation, and the ancient sled dogs were between 16 and 25 kg. The same standard has been found in the remains of sled dogs from this region 2,000 YBP and in the modern Siberian Husky breed standard. Other dogs were more massive at 30 kg and appear to be dogs that had been crossed with wolves and used for polar bear hunting. At death, the heads of the dogs had been carefully separated from their bodies by humans, probably for ceremonial reasons.

The study proposes that after having diverged from the common ancestor shared with the grey wolf, the evolution of the dog proceeded in three stages. The first was natural selection based on feeding behaviour within the ecological niche that had been formed through human activity. The second was artificial selection based on tamability. The third was directed selection based on forming breeds that possessed qualities to help with specific tasks within the human economy. The process commenced 30,000–40,000 YBP with its speed increasing in each stage until domestication became complete.

The Zhokhov dogs are the oldest known dogs to exhibit colour patterns. These possessed black colour patterns on their backs, which helped to distinguish them from white arctic wolves.

==== Dogs enter North America from northeastern Siberia ====
Material culture provides evidence for dog harnessing in the Arctic 9,000 YBP. Ancient DNA from the remains of these dogs indicates that they belong to the same genetic lineage as modern Arctic dogs, and that this lineage gave rise to the earliest native American dogs. Since the earliest native American dogs, multiple, genetically different lineages of dogs were introduced by the Thule people and European settlers. The European dogs replaced the dog lineages that were introduced more than 10,000 years ago.

In North America, the earliest dog remains were found in Lawyer's Cave on the Alaskan mainland east of Wrangell Island in the Alexander Archipelago of southeast Alaska, radiocarbon dating indicates 10,150 YBP. A genetic-based estimate indicates that this dog's lineage had split from the Siberian Zhokhov Island dog lineage 16,700 YBP. This timing coincides with the suggested opening of the North Pacific coastal route into North America. Stable isotope analysis can be used to identify some chemical elements, allowing researchers to make inferences about the diet of a species. An isotope analysis of bone collagen indicates a marine diet. The next earliest dogs were found in Illinois and radiocarbon dating indicates 9,900 YBP. These include three isolated burials at the Koster Site near the lower Illinois River in Greene County, and one burial 35 km away at the Stilwell II site in Pike County. These dogs were medium-sized adults around 50 cm (20 in) in height and around 17 kilograms (37 lb) in weight, with very active lifestyles and varied morphologies. Stable isotope analysis indicates a diet consisting largely of freshwater fish. Similar dog burials across Eurasia are thought to be due to the dog's importance in hunting to people who were trying to adapt to the changing environments and prey species during the Pleistocene-Holocene transition. In these places, the dog had gained an elevated social status.

In 2018, a study compared sequences of North American dog fossils with Siberian dog fossils and modern dogs. The nearest relative to the North American fossils was a 9,000 YBP fossil discovered on Zhokhov Island, arctic north-eastern Siberia, which was connected to the mainland at that time. The study inferred from mDNA that all of the North American dogs shared a common ancestor dated 14,600 YBP, and this ancestor had diverged along with the ancestor of the Zhokhov dog from their common ancestor 15,600 YBP. The timing of the Koster dogs shows that dogs entered North America from Siberia 4,500 years after humans did, were isolated for the next 9,000 years, and after contact with Europeans these no longer exist because they were replaced by Eurasian dogs. The (earlier wave of, prior to the Thule/Inuit introduction) pre-contact dogs exhibit a unique genetic signature that is now gone, with nDNA indicating that their nearest genetic relatives today are the arctic breed dogs: Alaskan malamutes, Greenland dogs, and Alaskan huskies and Siberian huskies.

In 2019, a study found that those dogs brought initially into the North American Arctic from northeastern Siberia were later replaced by dogs accompanying the Inuit during their expansion beginning 2,000 years ago. These Inuit dogs were more genetically diverse and more morphologically divergent when compared with the earlier dogs. Today, Arctic sledge dogs are among the last descendants in the Americas of this pre-European dog lineage. In 2020, the sequencing of ancient dog genomes indicates that in two Mexican breeds the Chihuahua retains 4% and the Xoloitzcuintli 3% pre-colonial ancestry.

==== Late Pleistocene wolf admixture ====
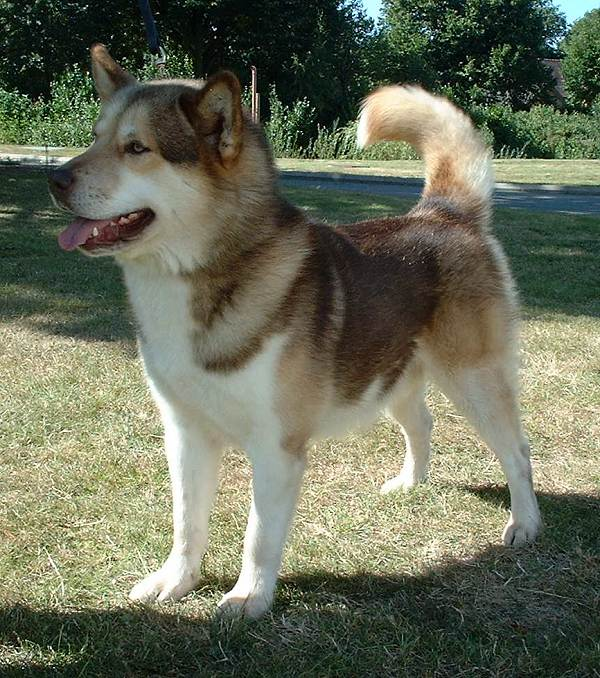
The Greenland Dog carries 3.5% genetic material inherited from a 35,000-year-old wolf from the Taymyr Peninsula, Arctic Siberia.

In 2015, a study mapped the first genome of a 35,000 YBP Pleistocene wolf fossil found in the Taimyr Peninsula, arctic northern Siberia and compared it with those of modern dogs and grey wolves. The Taimyr wolf was identified through mDNA as Canis lupus but from a population which had diverged from the dog–grey wolf lineage immediately before the dog and grey wolf diverged from each other, which implies that the majority of grey wolf populations today stems from an ancestral population that lived less than 35,000 years ago but before the inundation of the Bering Land Bridge with the subsequent isolation of Eurasian and North American wolves.

The Taimyr wolf was equally related to both dogs and modern wolves, but shared more alleles (i.e. gene expressions) with those breeds that are associated with high latitudes and arctic human populations: the Siberian Husky and Greenland Dog, and to a lesser extent the Shar Pei and Finnish Spitz. The Greenland Dog shows 3.5% Taimyr wolf ancestry, which indicates admixture between the Taimyr wolf population and the ancestral dog population of these four high-latitude breeds. These results can be explained either by a very early presence of dogs in northern Eurasia or by the genetic legacy of the Taimyr wolf being preserved in northern wolf populations until the arrival of dogs into high latitudes. This introgression could have provided early dogs living in high latitudes with adaptations to the new and challenging environment. It also indicates that the ancestry of present-day dog breeds descends from more than one region. An attempt to explore admixture between the Taimyr wolf and grey wolves produced unreliable results.

As the Taimyr wolf had contributed to the genetic makeup of the Arctic breeds, this indicates that the descendants of the Taimyr wolf survived until dogs were domesticated in Europe and arrived at high latitudes where they mixed with local wolves, and these both contributed to the modern Arctic breeds. Based on the most widely accepted oldest zooarchaeological dog remains, domestic dogs most likely arrived at high latitudes within the last 15,000 years.

The nuclear genome sequence was generated for a dog specimen that was found in the Late Neolithic passage grave at Newgrange, Ireland and radiocarbon dated at 4,800 YBP. A genetic analysis of the Newgrange dog showed that it was male, did not possess genetic variants associated with modern coat length or colour, was not as able to process starch as efficiently as modern dogs but more efficiently than wolves, and showed ancestry from a population of wolves that could not be found in other dogs or wolves today. The mutation rates calibrated from both the Taimyr wolf and the Newgrange dog genomes suggest that the modern wolf and dog populations diverged from a common ancestor between 20,000 and 60,000 YBP. This indicates that either dogs were domesticated much earlier than their first appearance in the archaeological record, or they arrived in the Arctic early, or both. Another view is that because northern breeds can trace at least some of their ancestry back to the Taimyr wolf, this indicates the possibility of more than one domestication event.

In 2020, the nuclear genome was generated of a 33,000 YBP Pleistocene wolf from an archaeological site on the Yana River, arctic northeastern Siberia. The Yana wolf sequence was more closely related to the 35,000 YBP Taimyr wolf than it was to modern wolves. There was evidence of gene flow between the Yana-Taimyr wolves and the Pre-Columbian, Zhokhov, and modern sled dogs. This suggests that genetic admixture has occurred between the Pleistocene wolves and the ancestor of these dogs. There was no evidence of admixture between sled dogs and the modern grey wolf for the past 9,500 years. Greenland sled dogs have been kept isolated from other breeds since their arrival in Greenland with the Inuit 850 years ago. Their lineage traces more genomic history to the Zhokhov dogs than any other arctic breed. Sled dogs do not show an adaptation to a starch-rich diet when compared with other dogs but do show an adaptation to a high intake of fat and fatty acids, which was not found in the Zhokhov dogs. The same adaptation has been found in Inuit and other arctic peoples. This suggests that the sled dogs adapted to the low starch and high fat diet of the people they coexisted with.

In 2021, a study of another four Late Pleistocene northeast Siberian wolf sequences showed that they are genetically similar to the Taimyr and Yana wolves. These six extinct wolves sequentially branched off from the lineage that leads to the modern wolf and dog. The 50,000 YBP Tirekhtyakh River, 48,000 YBP Bunge-Toll site, and 32,000 YBP Yana RHS specimens were separate lineages not related to each other. The 16,800 YBP Ulakhan Sular and the 14,100 YBP Tumat specimens both cluster with a modern wolf from Ellesmere Island, indicating that these two specimens derive from the same lineage as the North American wolves. All six Late Pleistocene wolves share alleles with Arctic dogs: Greenland dogs, Siberian and Alaskan huskies, Alaskan malamutes, the extinct Zhokhov dog and the extinct pre-European contact dogs of North America. It is possible that another population of extinct wolves, that were related to all six specimens, may have contributed to the ancestry of the Arctic dogs. There was evidence that four of the extinct Siberian wolves had contributed to the ancestry of modern wolf populations in Shanxi, western China, and possibly Chukotka and Inner Mongolia.

=== Dogs enter Japan ===
The oldest fossil of a dog that has been found in Japan dates to 9,500 YBP. With the beginning of the Holocene and its warmer weather, temperate deciduous forests rapidly spread onto the main island of Honshu and caused an adaption away from hunting megafauna (Naumann's elephant and Yabe's giant deer) to hunting the quicker sika deer and wild boar in dense forest. With this came a change in hunting technology, including a shift to smaller, triangular points for arrows. A study of the Jōmon people that lived on the Pacific coast of Honshu during the early Holocene shows that they were conducting individual dog burials and were probably using dogs as tools for hunting sika deer and wild boar, as hunters in Japan still do today.

Hunting dogs make major contributions to forager societies and the ethnographic record shows them being given proper names, treated as family members, and considered separate to other types of dogs. This special treatment includes separate burials with markers and grave-goods, with those that were exceptional hunters or that were killed on the hunt often venerated. A dog's value as a hunting partner gives them status as a living weapon and the most skilled elevated to taking on a "personhood", with their social position in life and in death similar to that of the skilled hunters.

Intentional dog burials together with ungulate hunting is also found in other early Holocene deciduous forest forager societies in Europe and North America, indicating that across the Holarctic temperate zone hunting dogs were a widespread adaptation to forest ungulate hunting.

=== Dogs enter Island Southeast Asia and Oceania ===
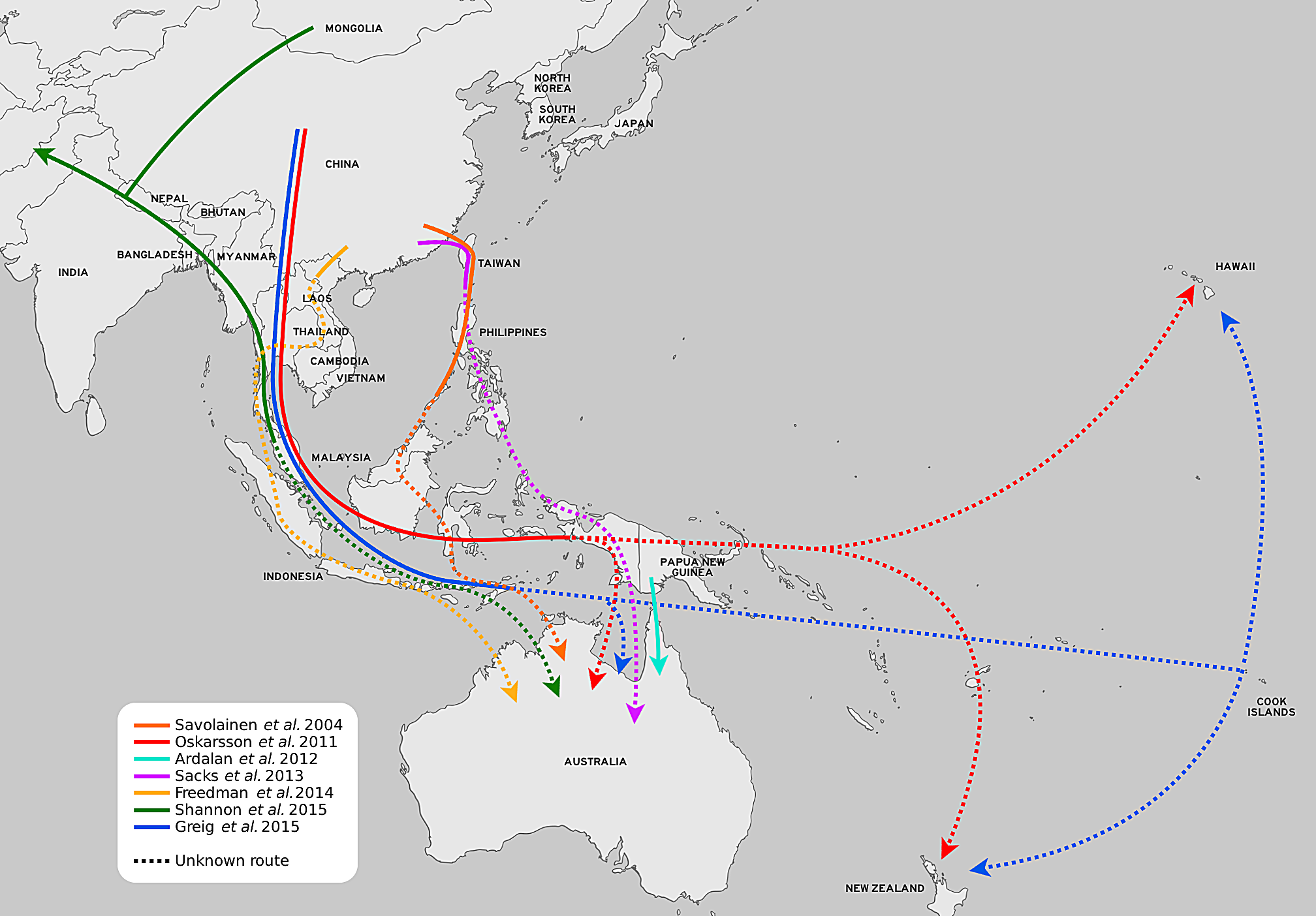
Map depicting possible phylogeographic origins of dingoes, New Guinea singing dogs, and Island Southeast Asian and Oceanian dogs, based on recent genetic evidence (Fillios & Taçon, 2016)

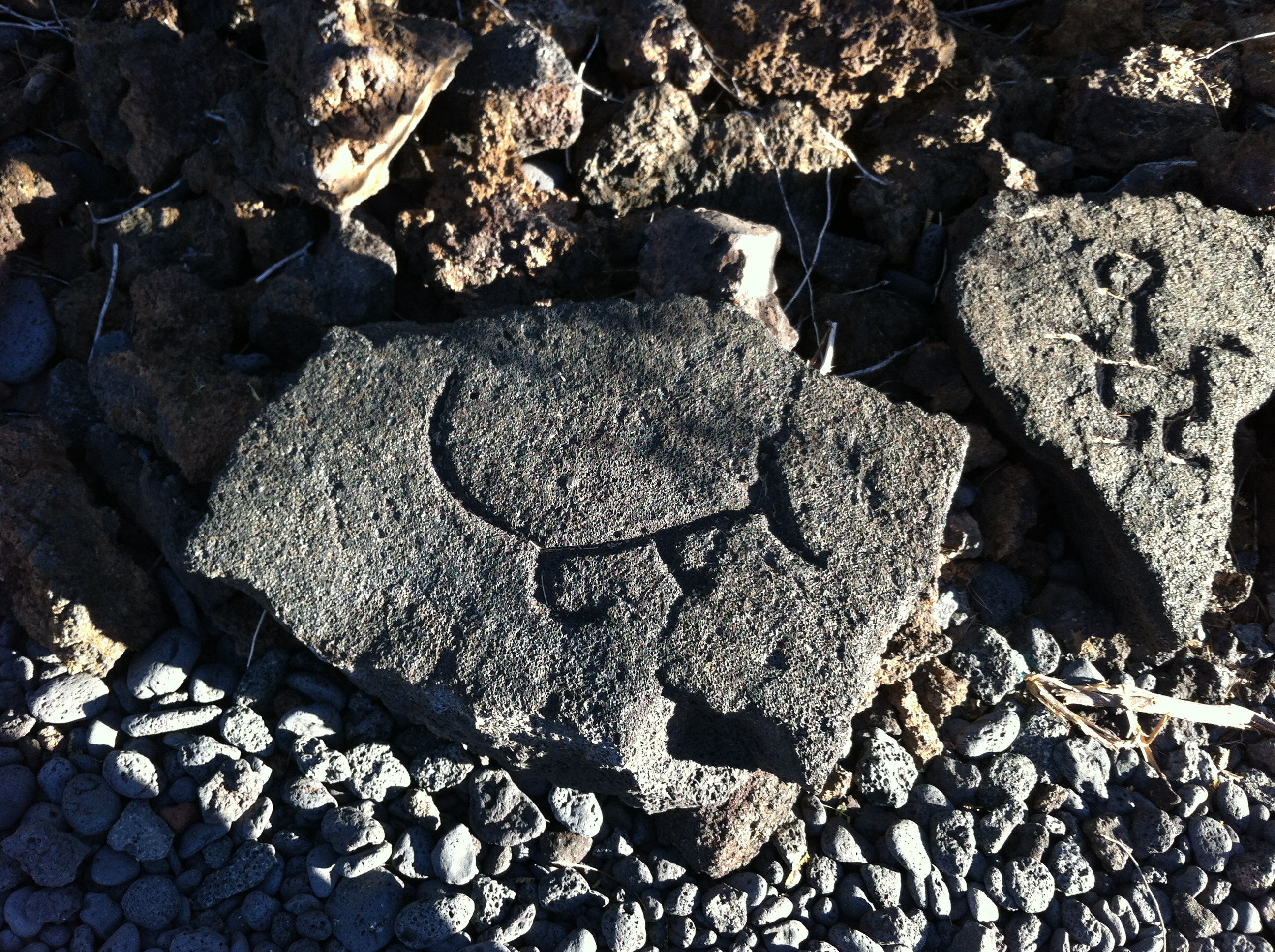
Ancient Hawaiian petroglyphic depiction of an ʻīlio (Hawaiian Poi Dog)

In 2020, an mDNA study of ancient dog fossils from the Yellow River and Yangtze River basins of southern China showed that most of the ancient dogs fell within haplogroup A1b, as do the Australian dingoes and the pre-colonial dogs of the Pacific, but in low frequency in China today. The specimen from the Tianluoshan archaeological site (Hemudu culture, pre-Austronesians), Zhejiang dates to 7,000 YBP and is basal to the entire lineage. The dogs belonging to this haplogroup were once widely distributed in southern China, then dispersed through Southeast Asia into New Guinea and Oceania, but were replaced in China 2,000 YBP by dogs of other lineages.

Dogs entered Island Southeast Asia, Australia, and New Guinea in at least two introduction events. One arriving with Paleolithic maritime hunter-gatherers by at least 10,000 to 5,000 BP, and another arriving with later Neolithic seafaring migrations of farming and trading Austronesian peoples (via Taiwan) by at least 5,000 BP. The Neolithic dogs are differentiated from previous populations in having the ability to digest starch, indicating that they accompanied humans who cultivated cereal crops. The oldest archaeological remains of dogs in Island Southeast Asia and Oceania is a dog burial in Timor and dingo remains in Australia, both of which are dated to around 3,500 BP. The former are believed to have been part of the second wave and the latter from the first wave. Austronesian dogs like the Taiwan dog were deeply valued as hunting companions (particularly for wild boar). In the Philippines, dog remains have been found buried near or beside human graves in archaeological sites.

From Island Southeast Asia, they were carried by Austronesian voyagers into Near Oceania. However, unlike in Island Southeast Asia, dogs lost their economic importance as hunting animals among Austronesians that reached the smaller islands in Melanesia and Polynesia, which had no populations of wild boar or other large mammals that could be hunted. They became a competitor for limited food resources and thus were themselves eaten. The Austronesian domesticated dogs originally carried by the Lapita Culture migrations were eaten to extinction in many islands since ancient times.

Thus Austronesian dogs were "lost" during the early colonization of Near Oceania. This caused a marked discontinuity in the genes of domesticated dogs, as well as the terms for "dog", among Austronesians in the Pacific Islands and Island Melanesia, in comparison to other Austronesian regions in Island Southeast Asia. However, dogs were later reintroduced from neighboring Papuan groups and were subsequently carried eastward into Polynesia by post-Lapita Austronesian migrations, reaching as far as Hawaii and Aotearoa. Though these dogs were treated as food animals, rather than hunting companions. Genetic studies have confirmed this, showing that Polynesian dogs are descended from the first wave of dog introductions and are not related to the dogs originating from Taiwan and the Philippines.

=== Dogs from the Near East enter Africa ===
In 2020, the sequencing of ancient dog genomes indicated that the lineage of modern dogs in sub-Sahara Africa shares a single origin from the Levant, where an ancestral specimen was dated to 7,000 YBP. This finding mirrors the gene flow of humans from the Levant into Africa during the Neolithic, along with cattle. Since then, there has been limited gene flow into African dogs until the past few hundred years. The descendants of a dog from Iran dated 5,800 YBP and dogs from Europe completely replaced the Levant dog lineage 2,300 YBP. This was associated with human migration from Iran and some minor migration from Europe. Today all Near Eastern dogs show 81% ancient Iranian and 19% Neolithic European ancestry.

The oldest dog remains to be found in Africa date 5,900 YBP and were discovered at the Merimde Beni-Salame Neolithic site in the Nile Delta, Egypt. The next oldest remains date 5,500 YBP and were found at Esh Shareinab on the Nile in Sudan. This suggests that the dog arrived from Asia at the same time as domestic sheep and goats. The dog then spread north to south down Africa beside livestock herders, with remains found in archaeological sites dated 925–1,055 YBP at Ntusi in Uganda, dated 950–1,000 YBP at Kalomo in Zambia, and then at sites south of the Limpopo River and into southern Africa. In 2020, the sequencing of ancient dog genomes indicates that the southern African Rhodesian Ridgeback retains 4% pre-colonial ancestry.

== See also ==
- Dog breed
- Dog type
- Human–canine bond
- Domesticated silver fox, a rare domesticated canine derived from a melanistic population of the red fox (Vulpes vulpes)
- Fuegian dog, an extinct domesticated canine derived from the culpeo (Lycalopex culpaeus)
- Hare Indian Dog, an extinct domesticated canine; possibly a domesticated form of the coyote (Canis latrans)
- Dusicyon, extinct possible domesticated canine from South America

== Bibliography ==
- Derr, Mark (2011). How the Dog Became the Dog: From Wolves to Our Best Friends. Penguin Group. ISBN 978-1-4683-0269-1.
- Pierotti, R.; Fogg, B. (2017). The First Domestication: How Wolves and Humans Coevolved. Yale University Press. ISBN 978-0-300-22616-4.
- Shipman, P. (2015). The Invaders:How humans and their dogs drove Neanderthals to extinction. Harvard University Press. ISBN 978-0-674-73676-4.
