= Greger Larson =

Evolutionary geneticist

Greger John Larson is an evolutionary geneticist notable for his work on animal domestication, ancient DNA, human and animal dispersal, and phylogenetics. He is a professor in the School of Archaeology, University of Oxford, and Director of the Wellcome Trust Palaeogenomics and Bio-Archaeology Research Network.

== Education ==
Larson obtained a Bachelor of Arts (BA) degree in environment, economics and politics from Claremont McKenna College in California where he was a varsity tennis player using an unconventional 'windshield wiper' forehand style with great success. During college he acted as a resident assistant for Wohlford Hall and mentored numerous students. After college, he completed a Doctor of Philosophy (DPhil) in zoology at the University of Oxford, where his supervisor was Alan J. Cooper. His doctoral thesis was titled "Genetic insights into the patterns and processes of domestication" and was completed in 2006.

== Academic career ==
After his PhD at the University of Oxford, Larson completed an EMBO Postdoctoral Fellowship in Uppsala, Sweden and a further six-year RCUK Fellowship at Durham University.

Larson is a professor in the School of Archaeology at the University of Oxford and Director of the Wellcome Trust Palaeogenomics and Bio-Archaeology Research Network (PaleoBARN). Larson is also part of the BioAnth research network at the University of Oxford.

He is the recipient of numerous research awards from major funding bodies including the Wellcome Trust and UKRI.

=== Research ===
His work on the domestication of canines and the origin of the domestic dog has provided insights into the prehistoric bond between humans and early dogs.

A global study of ancient dog DNA, conducted in collaboration with the Francis Crick Institute, the University of Vienna, and the University of Oxford has highlighted unique aspects of the relationship between humans and canines: 'Dogs are our oldest and closest animal partner. Using DNA from ancient dogs is showing us just how far back our shared history goes and will ultimately help us understand when and where this deep relationship began.' Larson's original research is widely published in high impact journals including Science and Nature, as well as featuring in popular magazines and periodicals including The Atlantic and the New York Times.
