= Bonn–Oberkassel dog =

Late Paleolithic dog specimen

Coordinates: 50°43′55.2″N 7°5′33.43″E

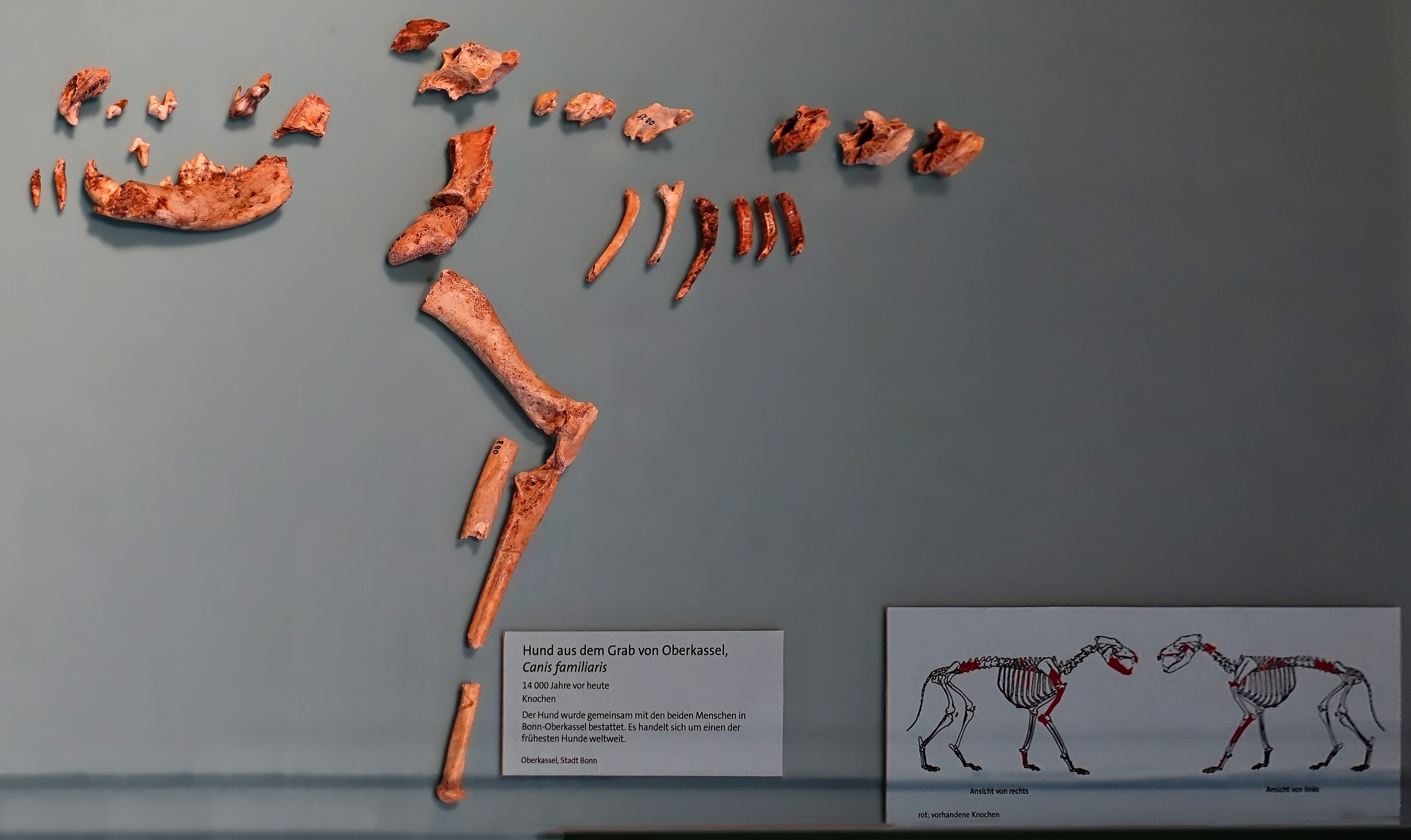
- Display of the Bonn–Oberkassel dog at the Rheinisches Landesmuseum Bonn
- Common name: Bonn–Oberkassel dog
- Species: Canis familiaris
- Age: c. 14,000 years (aged c. 7 months)
- Place discovered: Bonn, North Rhine-Westphalia, Germany
- Date discovered: 1914

The Bonn–Oberkassel dog (German: Hund von Bonn–Oberkassel) was a Late Paleolithic (c. 14,000 years BP / c. 12,000 BCE) dog whose skeletal remains were found buried alongside two humans. Discovered in early 1914 by quarry workers in Oberkassel, Bonn, Germany, the double burial site was analyzed by a team of archaeologists from the University of Bonn. It was around 7.5 months old at death, 40–50 cm (16–20 in) tall at the shoulder, and weighed 13–18 kg (29–40 lb), suggesting a slender build similar to West Asian wolves (such as the Indian wolf) or some modern sighthounds.

The dog's lower jaw was first thought to be from a wolf and placed into museum storage with the human remains, while the dog's other bones were put into the university's geological collections. The bones of the Bonn–Oberkassel dog were reunited in the late 1970s and reidentified as a domestic dog attributed to the Magdalenian culture, dating to the beginning of the Late Glacial Interstadial, c. 14,000 BP. A total of 32 identifiable bone fragments have been attributed to the dog. These have been used to estimate a number of the animal's characteristics.

Osteoarthritis, alongside signs of enamel defects, missing teeth, and gum disease, indicate that the Bonn–Oberkassel dog survived a canine distemper infection as a puppy. Due to the high likelihood of death without assistance, the puppy's survival was probably due to human care. Such care would have involved providing food and water, as well as frequent cleaning. Extensive human care suggests significant compassion towards the dog, possibly indicating that the dog was seen as a pet. It is unknown how the dog died; it may have been due to the effects of its illness or other natural causes. Another possibility is that it was killed or sacrificed to be buried alongside the humans, an archaeologically attested practice linked to spiritual and religious motives. A molar belonging to a second, older dog was found at the site, likely used as a grave good.

== Background ==
Domestic dogs are likely descended from populations of gray wolves. The time, place, and region in which dogs were initially domesticated, as well as the number of separate domestication events which took place, are heavily debated among scholars. The presence of dogs by the later portion of the Magdalenian period of Paleolithic Europe (c. 15,000–12,000 BP / c. 13,000 – 10,000 BCE) is well established, but debated examples of dogs from the Aurignacian (c. 43,000–26,000 BP) have been described. Some genetic studies place the origin of dogs with a population of East Asian wolves c. 39,000 BP. Numerous prehistoric dog burials are known, spanning from ritualistic and symbolic burial to simple corpse disposal out of hygienic concern. Factors such as the presence of grave goods, the positioning of the dog within a grave, and burial alongside humans can serve as indicators for care and symbolic intent.

Various Magdalenian dog finds have been dated to c. 15,000–14,500 BP, corresponding to the beginning of the Late Glacial Interstadial and rapid climate change, with the Pleistocene Eurasian mammoth steppe giving way to forests. Humans may have sought out hunting dogs in increasingly "closed-in" conditions due to their greater smell and hearing abilities.

== Discovery and research history ==
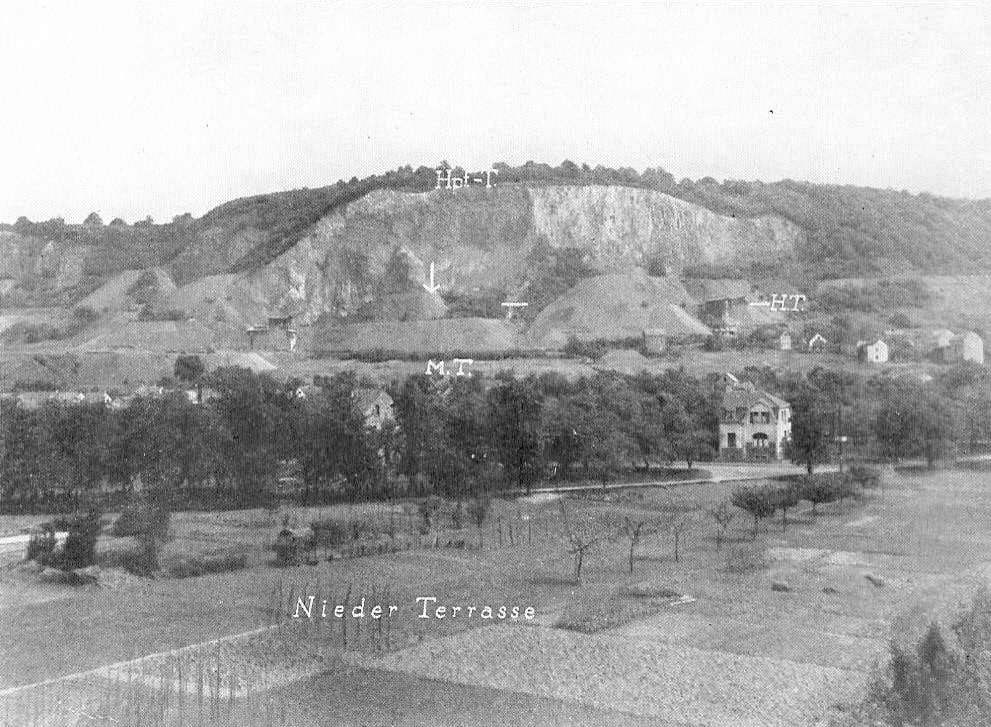
Overview of the Oberkassel basalt quarry, with location of burial site indicated by arrow

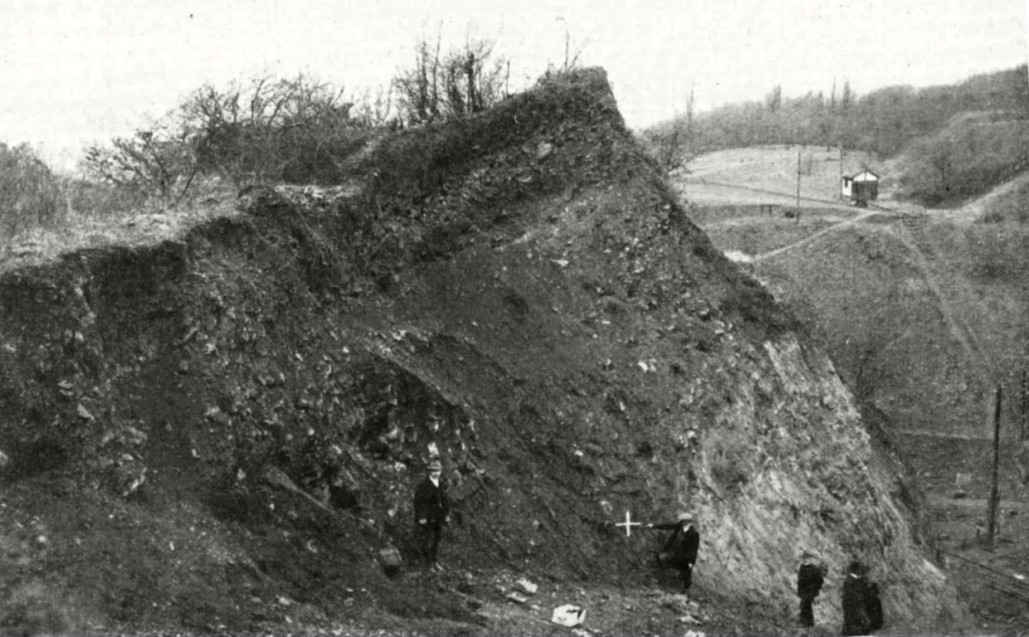
Workers at the quarry, pointing to the location where the burial was discovered (marked with a white cross)

On 18 February 1914, workmen constructing a cart track at Peter Uhrmacher's basalt quarry in Oberkassel, Bonn, Germany, discovered two human skeletons, an older man and a young woman, buried within a layer of sandy loam between weathered basalt. The dig site was on the Kuckstein, on the southern edge of the Rabenlay mountain. Damaging extraction methods partially destroyed the grave, likely contributing to the loss of many of the bones. Uhrmacher informed a local teacher of the discovered remains; the teacher, recognizing the importance of the find, alerted archaeologists of the University of Bonn. An archaeological team assembled three days later and dated it to the "Reindeer Period" (Upper Paleolithic), and additionally noted various animal bones, including the "right lower jaw of a wolf."

Several other animal bones were later identified from the site, including a bear penis bone, a red deer incisor, and an elk-antler sculpture of what is likely an elk head. A team comprising physiologist Max Verworn, anatomist Robert Bonnet and geologist Gustav Steinmann examined the skeletons and tentatively dated the site to the Magdalenian due to commonalities in grave goods.

A 1919 monograph described the canine skeleton further, grouping other bone fragments with the specimen. While the two humans skeletons were put into storage in the Rheinisches Landesmuseum Bonn, the animal remains from the site were split into two groups. The canine's lower jaw was placed into storage alongside the human remains, but various other pieces of the animal were stored in the University of Bonn's geological collections without records of their origins.

In the late 1970s, Erwin Cziesla, a prehistory student studying the Oberkassel site, rediscovered the separated material within the university collections. The remains were reunited at the Landesmuseum and placed under further study, with the lower jaw and associated bones identified as those of a domestic dog. A 1982 study by Cziesla's advisor, Gerhard Bosinski dated the Oberkassel site to the Middle Magdalenian due to observed similarities between a carved bone discovered alongside the remains and the contours découpés bone figurines of Middle Magdalenian France. This made the Bonn–Oberkassel dog the earliest known example of a domesticated animal, a status now shared by other Magdalenian dog finds.

Radiocarbon dating of the remains by the Oxford Radiocarbon Accelerator Unit in 1993 specified this age as slightly later than originally thought, into the end of the Magdalenian and the earliest portion of the Late Glacial Interstadial, c. 14,000 BP. These dates were later supported by radiocarbon dating via accelerator mass spectrometry taken by Kiel University in 1997; the results also confirmed contemporary dates between the canine and human remains. A 1994 reexamination created a catalog of the remains and grouped several other bones, previously interpreted as other animals, as portions of the dog. Yet more fragments were discovered during and after the dating examinations, all without any duplicates in the skeleton. The Bonn–Oberkassel dog is now part of a small group of unambiguous early dog specimens found across Germany, Spain, and France, dating to c. 15,000–13,500 BP. Finds of domestic dogs before this are tentative and disputed.

== Physical description ==
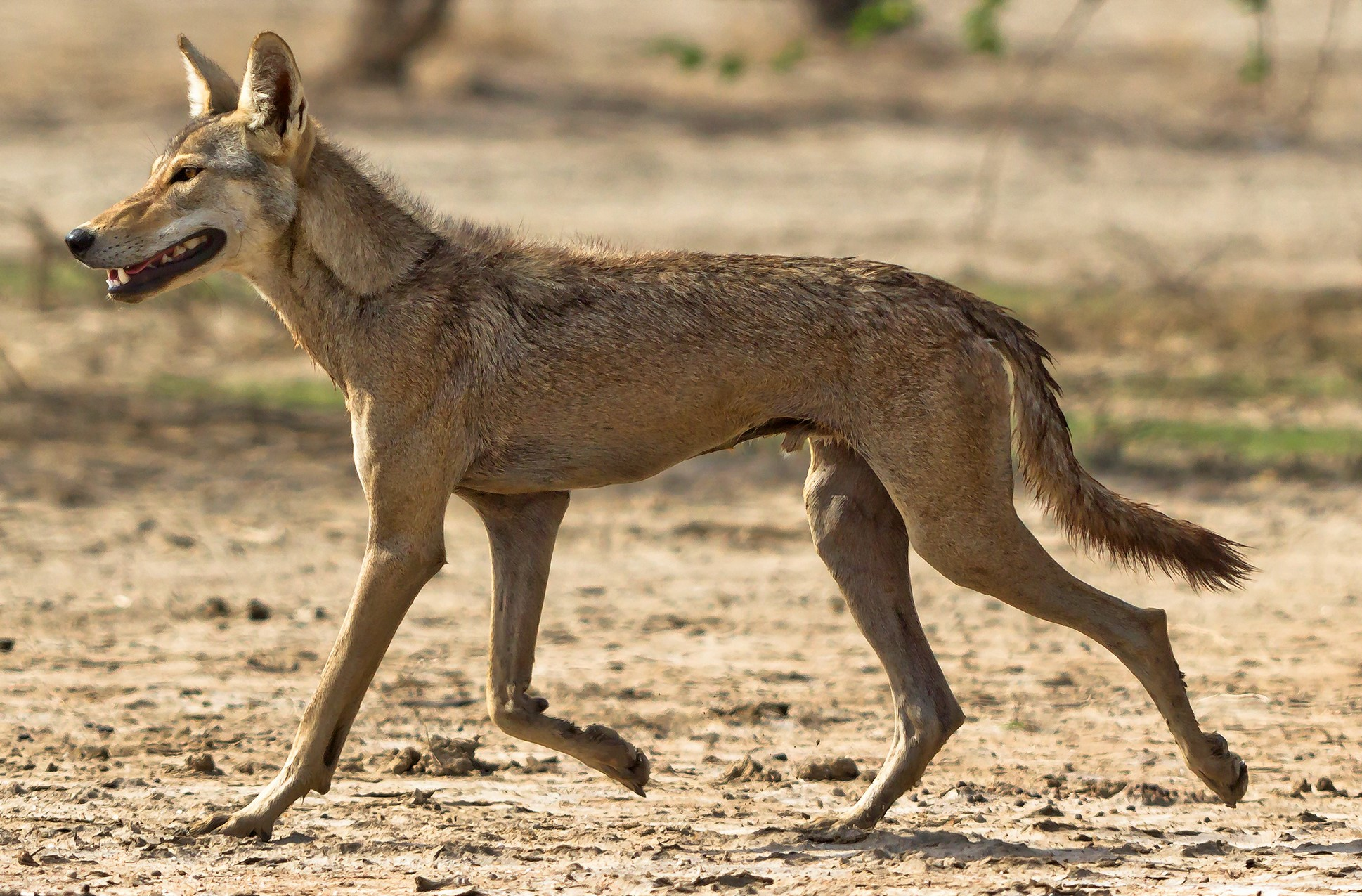
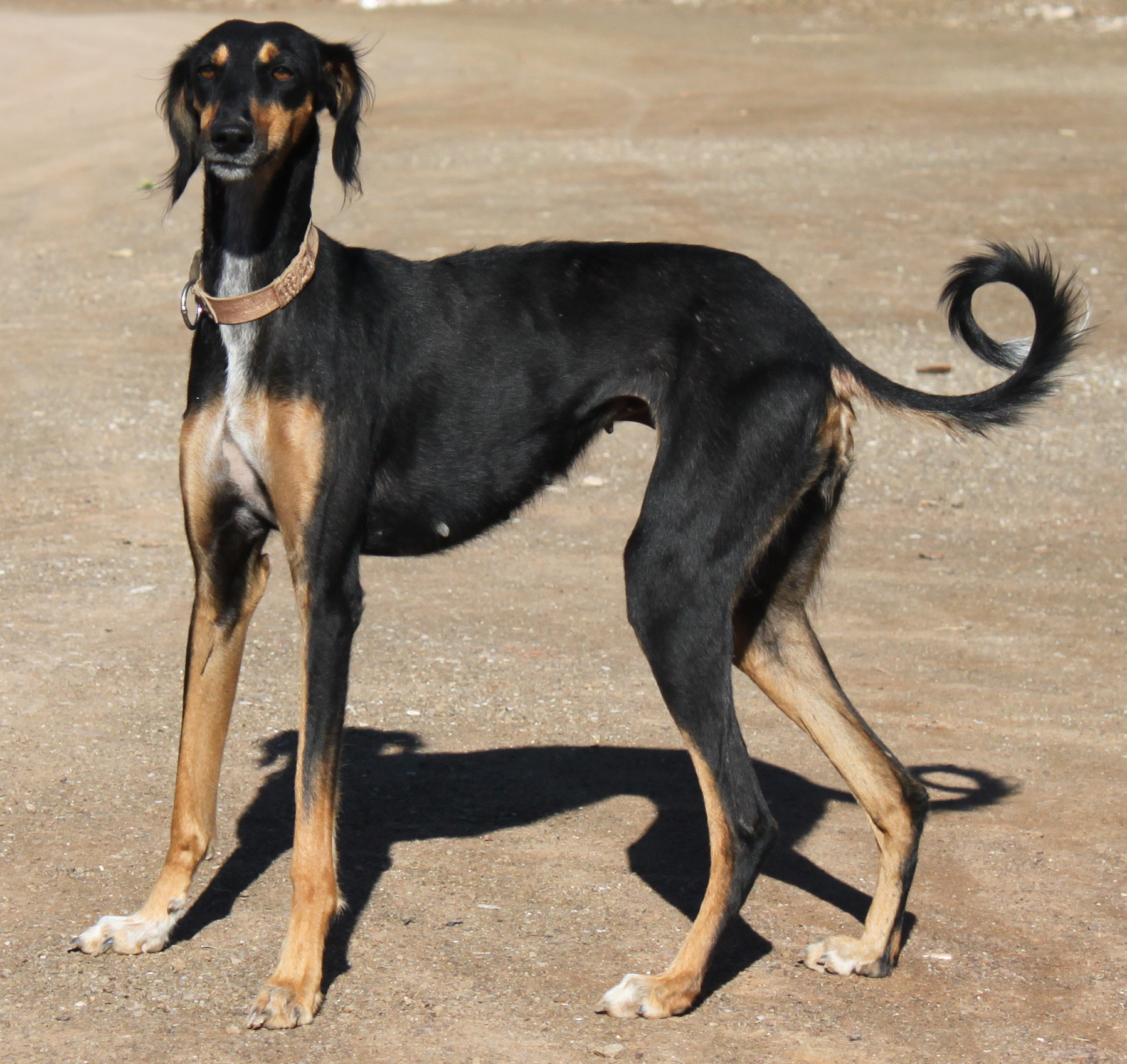
The estimated height and weight of the Bonn–Oberkassel dog suggest a build similar to West Asian wolves (such as the Indian wolf), or some modern sighthounds, such as the Saluki.

Thirty-two (Note: Not including a loose right lower molar from a separate individual.) identifiable bone fragments have been identified from the Bonn–Oberkassel dog. This comprises nine cranial pieces (Note: Including portions of the right lower jaw and premaxilla, a coronoid process, and seven loose teeth.) and twenty-three fragments from across the rest of the body, including ribs, vertebrae (including cervical, thoracic, and lumbar), two partial scapulas, a damaged left humerus alongside the end of another, fragments of the left radius, and portions of both ulnas. An additional twenty-five very small bone fragments could not be firmly identified, but many were likely portions of the ribs, skull, and vertebrae.

Modern scholarship dates the dog to c. 14,000 BP ± 200 years. The dog likely had a height of 40–50 cm (16–20 in) at the shoulder, (Note: One estimation, based on the diameter of a left diaphyseal humeral fragment, estimated the height at shoulder level as 46.8 centimetres (18.4 in).) with an estimated weight of 13–18 kg (29–40 lb). Such figures suggest a relatively slim build for the animal, comparable to the Indian wolf and some breeds of sighthound.

Estimations place the dog's age at death as around 7.5 months. The cranial growth plate of the lumbar vertebra is closed; (Note: Growth plates are areas of cartilage at the end of bones in which bone growth takes place. These harden into bone when growth stops.) it usually closes at 7 months in modern dogs. However, the same vertebra's caudal plate is open, which in modern dogs closes at around 8 months.

== Health ==
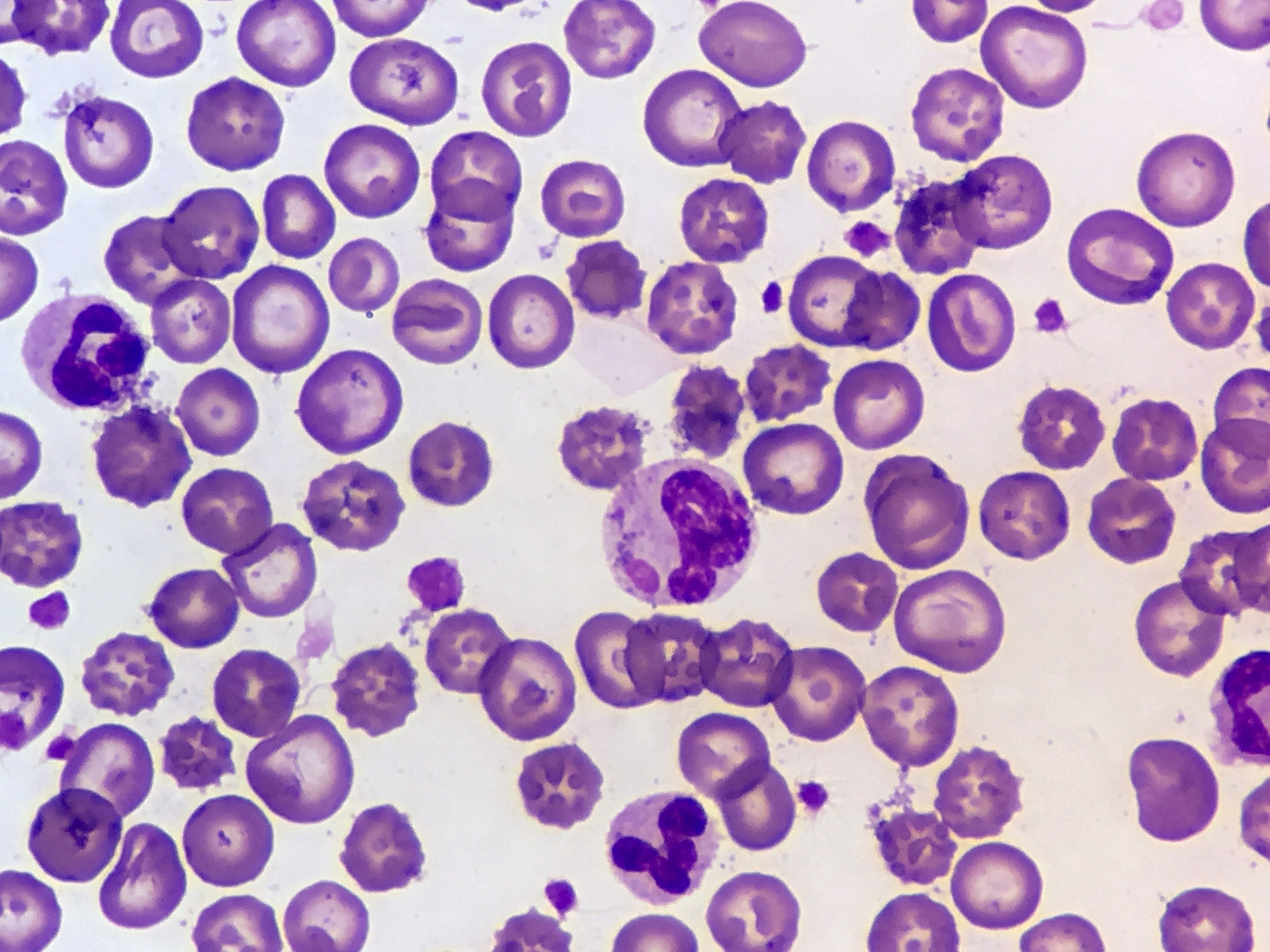
Canine distemper virus (Morbillivirus canis) inclusions in neutrophils seen under a microscope

The Bonn–Oberkassel dog likely suffered from canine distemper as a puppy. Canine distemper is a serious viral disease with an estimated fatality rate of 75% in modern domestic puppies, often due to starvation, dehydration, and secondary infections over the course of three waves. Signs such as enamel loss, missing teeth, and severe gum disease are consistent with a diagnosis of canine distemper. This infection was likely contracted at 19 or 21 weeks old, and lasted around three weeks. The dog's remaining canine tooth showed heavy abrasion and enamel loss, probably caused by compulsive stone chewing. Pica (consumption of inedible objects) is a common indicator of the disease's impact on the brain during its last wave.

Bone spurs are visible on both ulnas and elbows, suggesting osteoarthritis. Osteoarthritis is extremely rare in dog remains before the end of the Iron Age; one of the only other known cases is a buried dog from the Anderson site in Tennessee, c. 7000 BP. The condition likely began around a month before death, at approximately 28 weeks of age. Most typical causes of elbow osteoarthritis in modern young dogs are unlikely to have created the bone spurs seen in the Bonn–Oberkassel dog. Epileptic seizures linked to canine distemper may have caused the osteoarthritis, through physical trauma from falling without control.

=== Treatment by humans ===
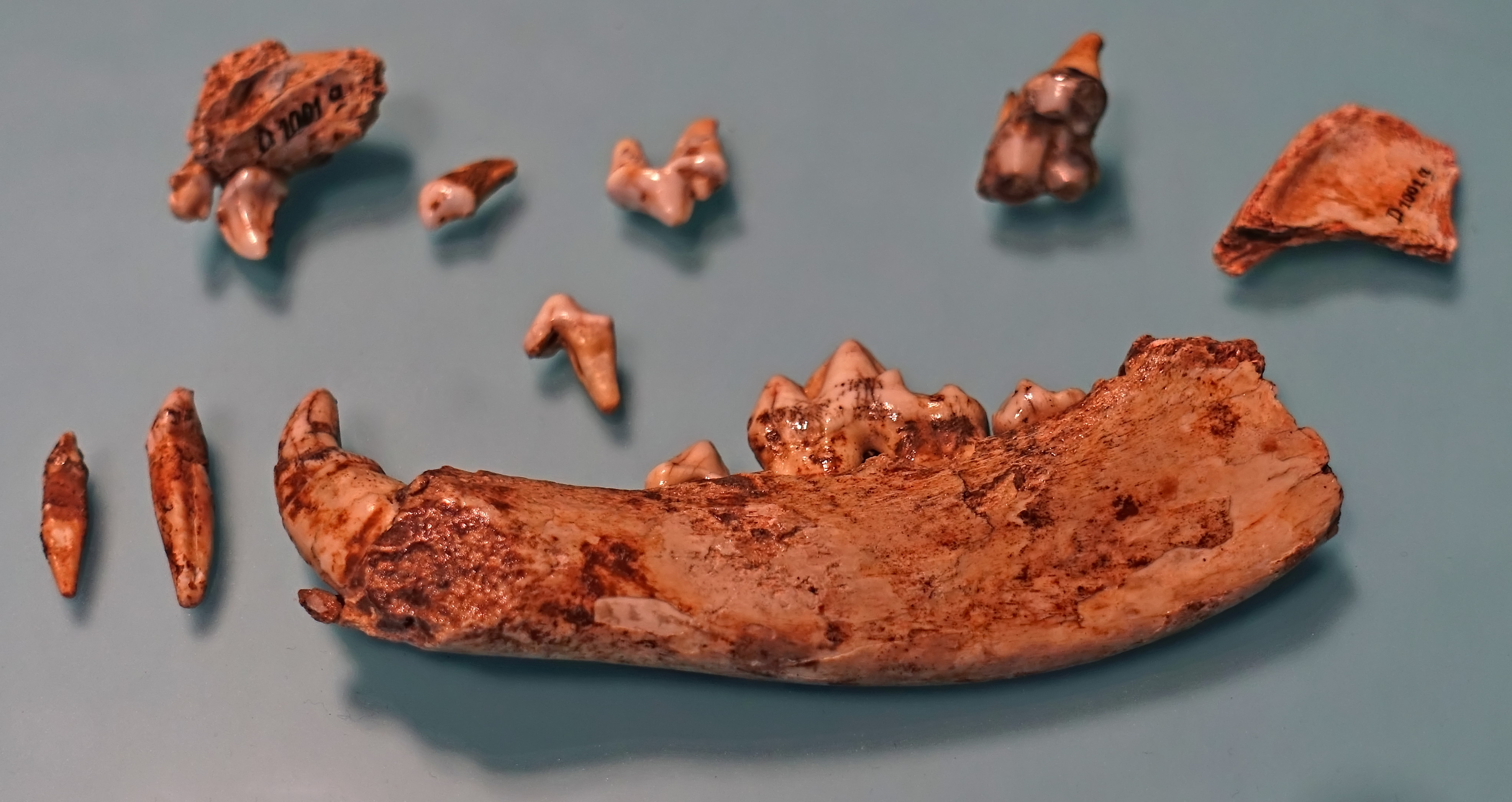
The skull remains of the Bonn–Oberkassel dog

Unassisted survival of canine distemper is "almost non-existent"; in a 2014 study of the skulls of 544 adult wild dogs and wolves in museum collections, not one had the horizontal enamel damage typical of the disease in puppies. The young Bonn–Oberkassel dog likely required an intensive level of care during its three-week infection. The humans caring for the puppy likely would have needed to clean it from the vomit and diarrhea caused by the disease, as well as providing water and possibly food. If the infection occurred during the winter, they would have additionally needed to warm the puppy. Such actions likely indicate that humans felt a close bond, significant compassion, and empathy for the puppy.

As the prolonged disease required significant effort and likely prevented training for use as a hunting dog, the care given to the dog may have been of little practical benefit. Possible motivations may have been due to spiritual motives or simply compassion towards the puppy. The dog may have been regarded as a pet, possibly belonging to the two people buried alongside it.

=== Death ===
It is unknown whether the dog died from its past illness or other natural causes, or if it was killed to bury it alongside the two humans. Killing or sacrifice of dogs alongside human burials is often linked to spiritual, religious, and ritualistic motives, including belief in an afterlife.

== Second dog ==
A right upper molar found in the burial, initially believed to be part of the Bonn–Oberkassel dog, was determined to belong to another dog. The molar was found to be significantly smaller than the size predicted for the main specimen, differed in color from the other teeth, and showed signs of significantly more wear, indicating a smaller and older individual. The tooth was likely used as a grave good.

== See also ==
- Human–canine bond
- List of individual dogs
- Paleolithic dog
- de:Doppelgrab von Oberkassel (Double grave of Oberkassel) on the German Wikipedia
