= Veretye =

Veretye Веретье
- Village
- Location within Vologda Oblast Location within Russia
- Coordinates: 59°25′N 40°14′E
- Country: Russia
- Region: Vologda Oblast
- District: Sokolsky District
- Time zone: UTC+3:00

Veretye (Russian: Веретье) is a rural locality (a village) in Prigorodnoye Rural Settlement, Sokolsky District, Vologda Oblast, Russia. The population was 13 as of 2002.

== Geography ==
Veretye is located 15 km southeast of Sokol (the district's administrative centre) by road. Kuznetsovo is the nearest rural locality.
