= Human–canine bond =

Interspecies relationship

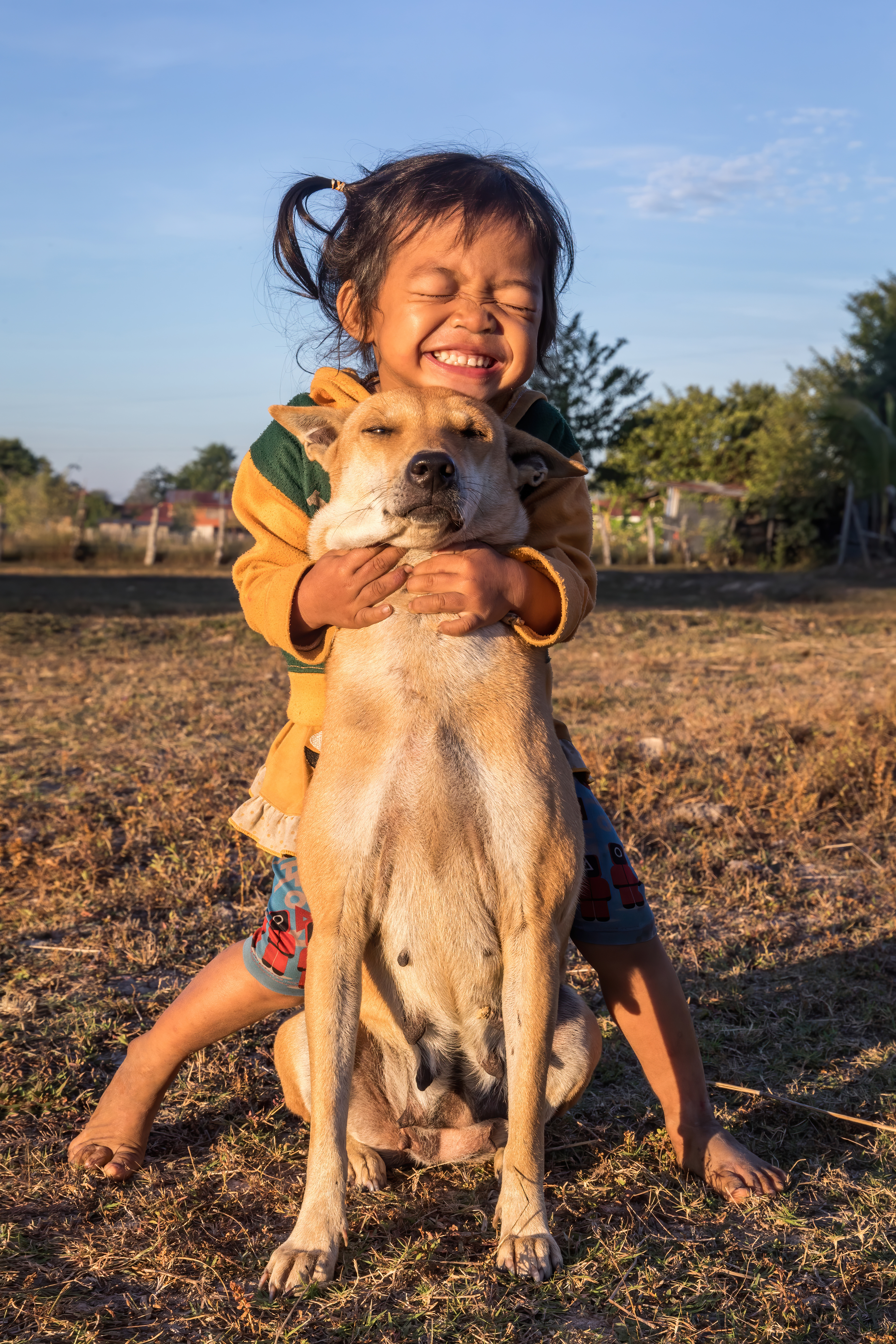
A two-year-old Laotian girl with her dog

The human–canine bond is mainly rooted in the domestication of the dog from the wolf, which began occurring through their long-term association with hunter-gatherers more than 30,000 years ago. The earliest known genetic evidence of the relationship between dogs and humans is attested by the 1914 discovery of the Bonn–Oberkassel dog, who was buried alongside two humans in modern-day Oberkassel, Germany, approximately 15,000 years ago.

Studies have demonstrated that both dogs and humans release oxytocin while spending quality time together. This release of oxytocin is correlated with the formation of a strong social bond. Canines are capable of distinguishing between positive and negative human facial expressions and will react accordingly. Dogs have appeared in religions all over the world, from ancient siberian rites of passage to Christian saint veneration, and are strongly associated with Mesoamerican folklore and myth, indicating the reverence that some cultures have given to dogs in their religious and sacred practices.

For centuries, the phrase "man's best friend" has commonly been used to refer to dogs, as they were the first species and the only large carnivore to have been domesticated. This companionship is most evident in Western countries, such as the United States, where 44% of households were found to be keeping at least one dog as a pet. Despite this dogs have also been seen in a negative light with uncleanliness, transmission of diseases, and aggressive behavior being associated with dogs, depending on the region, moment in history, and cultural interpretations about them.

== Attachment ==
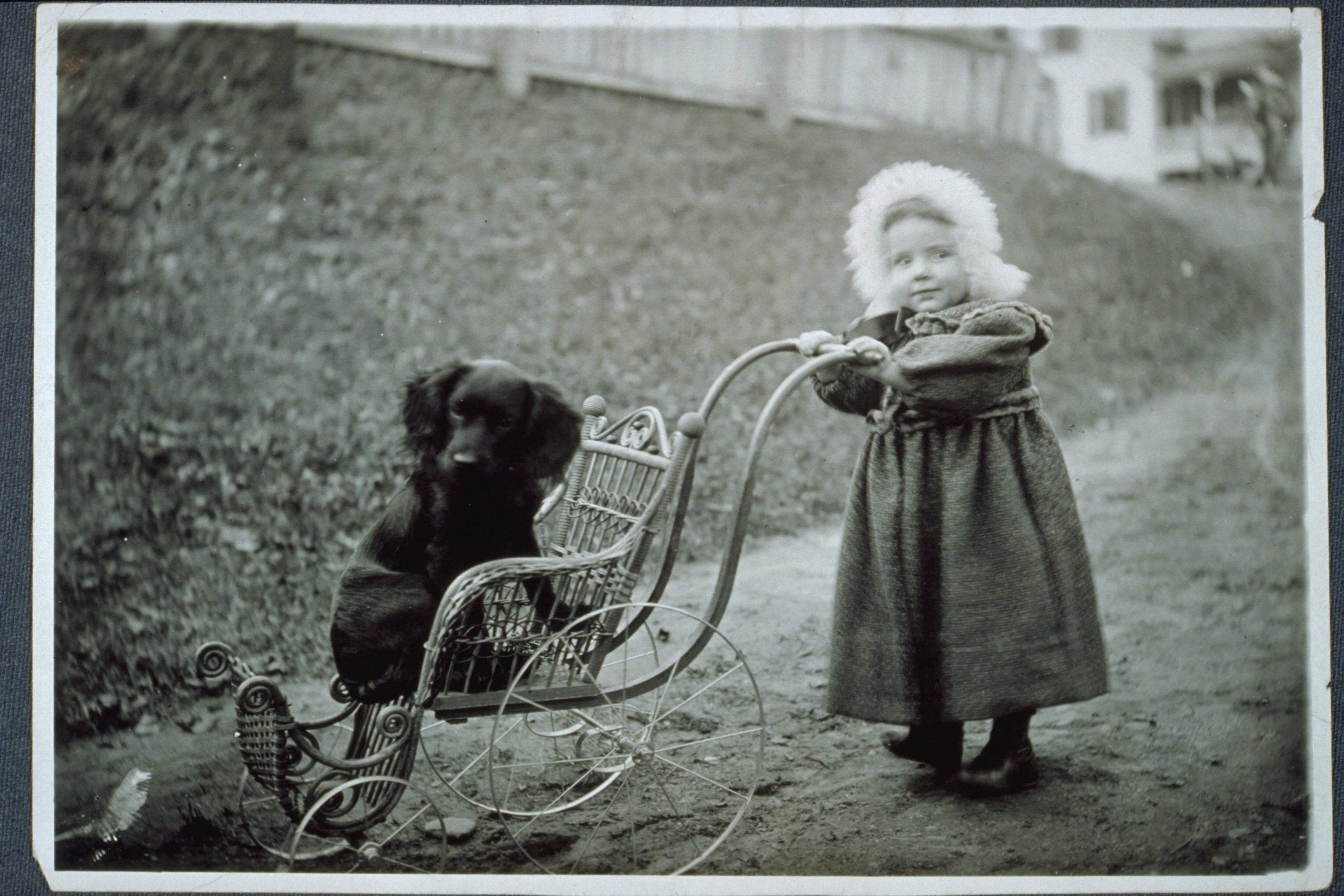
A child pushing a dog in a carriage, early 20th century

Psychologists believe that the relationship between human and canine is a bidirectional attachment bond, which resembles that of the typical human caretaker/infant relationship, and shows all of the usual hallmarks of a typical bond. Some examples of behaviors that led scientists to this conclusion is the display of proximity seeking behavior where the canine will seek out its caretaker as a means to cope with stress, and consequently the absence of the caretaker will trigger separation anxiety to a varying degree. Another such behavior is the safe haven effect, which describes when the canine more freely explores novel objects in the caretaker's presence. Canines are capable of assessing humans' emotional states, as well as discriminating humans by levels of familiarity.

Studies have demonstrated that shelter dogs benefit from interacting with complete strangers. These interactions result in a reduction in plasma cortisol, which is correlated to an overall reduction in stress. These results demonstrate the canines' innate desire to form an attachment with a human, and also demonstrate the positive health effects for the canine associated with the relationship.

Upon loss, due to death or retirement, the majority of caregivers report intense feelings of grief.

== Research ==
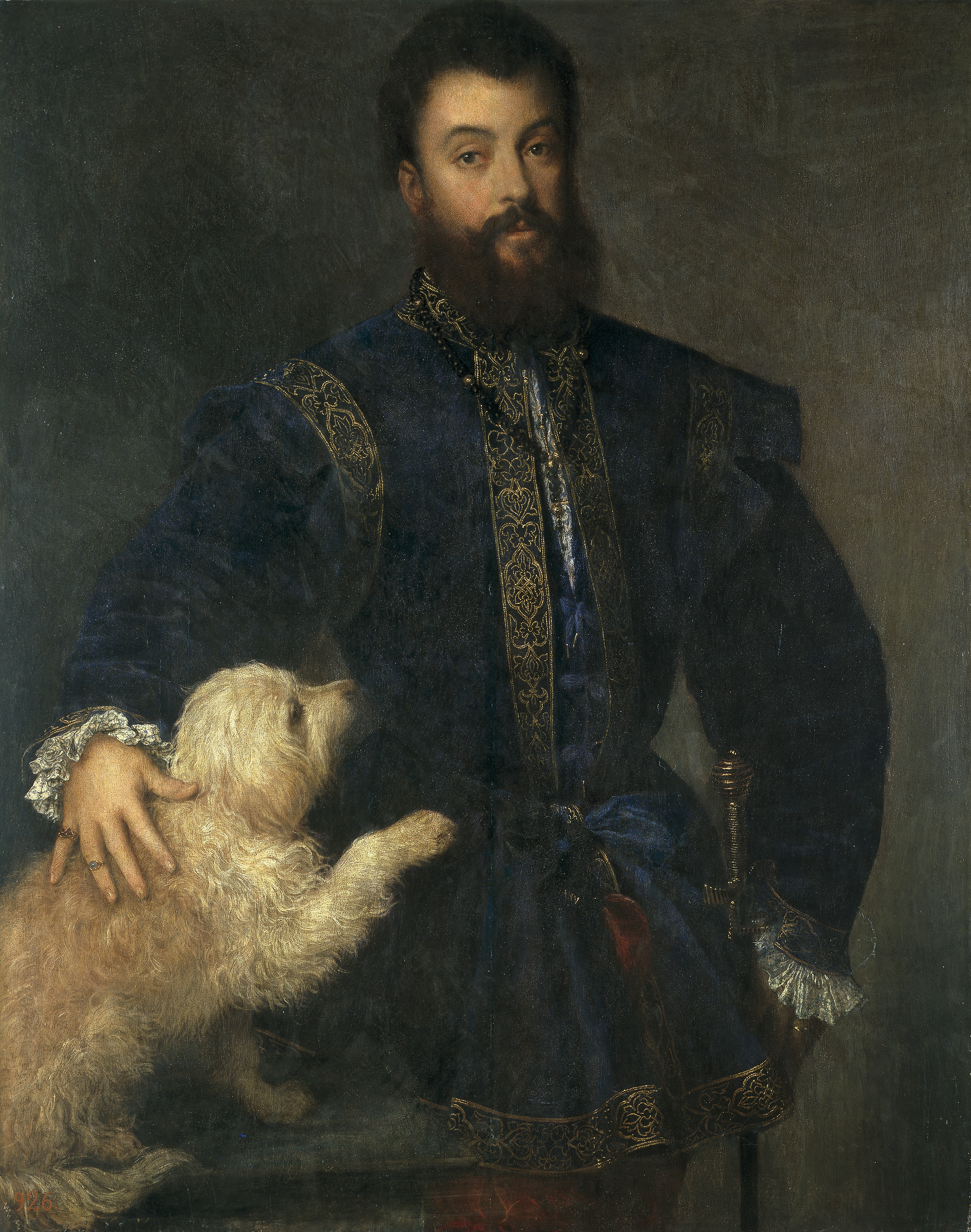
Frederick II of Gonzaga petting a dog, by Titian in Portrait of Federico II Gonzaga (c. 1529)

Human–canine bonding was recognized by Boris M. Levinson, who greatly influenced the establishment of the field of study. Levinson accidentally discovered the benefits of assisted pet therapy when he found that withdrawn and uncommunicative children would interact positively whenever he brought his dog, Jingles, to their therapy sessions. His discovery was further reinforced by Sam and Elizabeth Corson, who were among the first to research and evaluate pet-facilitated therapy.

In the early 1980s, the term 'human–animal bond' was officially coined by Leo K. Bustad, who delivered a summary lecture on the Human–Pet Relationship on October 28, 1983, at the International Symposium in Vienna. This symposium was held in honour of Konrad Lorenz, and during his lecture, Bustad praised him for his work on the human–animal bond and encouraged others to build on Lorenz's work on the subject. In the early 1970s, Konrad Lorenz had developed the field of ethology with his landmark research on the imprinting of behaviors in geese.

Bustad and other pet therapy advocates formed the Delta Society, which was built on the earlier work of Levinson and Croson. In the 1970s and 1980s, national and international conferences led to greater recognition of the human–animal bond. Since then, there has been widespread media coverage of animal-assisted activity and therapy programs and service dog training.

== Types of relationships ==
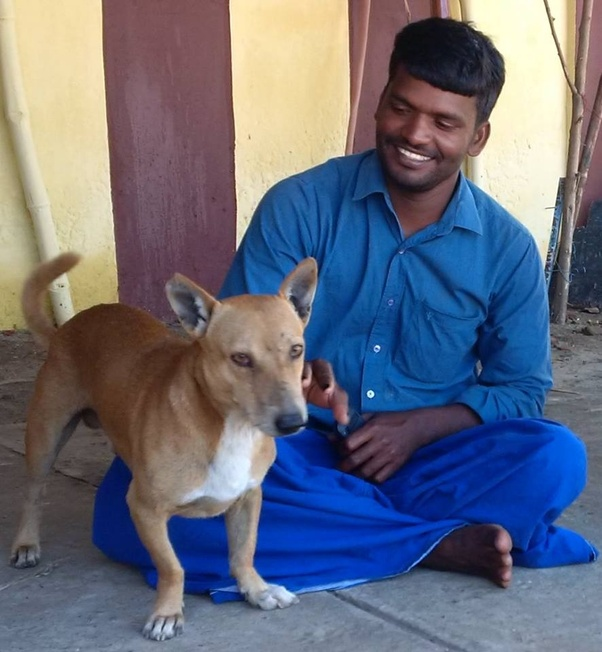
Man with dog in India

Today, dogs are mostly kept as household pets, although there still remains a sizeable population of working dogs worldwide. Working dogs today perform a wider variety of jobs than ever before in history, working in fields such as drug and explosive detection, therapy, hunting, and invasive species detection. Dogs are used for service due to their highly developed sense of smell. Research shows they can smell human emotions. A strong canine-human bond is formed between the dog and the handler while performing jobs together; a strong bond is required to safely and quickly perform their jobs. Many of the people who work with a canine partner will also live with them, which facilitates a strong bond between both partners. Many military dogs have also been adopted by their former handlers once they have been retired. Canine-human jobs span fields including hunting, herding, military, medical, and search.

=== Pets ===
In the Western world, dogs are most commonly found as household pets. The overwhelming majority of American dog owners report that they feel as if their dog is a member of their family. Many Western owners allow their dogs to sleep in their beds with them and report lessened anxiety. Almost universally positive outcomes are reported among those who keep dogs as pets. The human-canine bond is strengthened, or diminished, depending on the quantity and quality of the time spent with the canine and through activities such as routine walking, feeding, grooming, and play.

In some interpretations of Muslim and Jewish religious practices the dog is regarded as unclean, and keeping a dog as a pet is generally seen as impure.

=== Herding ===
Kazakh shepherd with his herding dogs

The herding dog has long worked alongside humans, with the start of herding activities roughly being around the time of the domestication of sheep. Today's herding dogs have evolved a unique set of traits and mannerisms that makes them ideal for the job. Herding dogs may generally fall into several categories: protectors, drivers, headers, and heelers. Herding dogs rely on many predator skills such as posture and eye contact rather than brute force.

=== Hunting ===
Hunting is one of the oldest jobs that dogs have performed alongside humans. Cave art dating back to the Neolithic age depicting dogs and humans hunting together has been found. In particular, a mural discovered in Saudi Arabia that is more than 9000 years old depicts a domesticated dog being used for hunting. Today hunting dogs generally fall into one of three categories; Terriers, gun dogs, and hounds. Terriers are smaller dogs which can be used to hunt small animals such as birds and rabbits. Gun dogs are mostly used during upland and wetland hunting to retrieve downed game. Hounds typically specialize in the chase and utilize a variety of noises to flush out game, used in hunting larger mammals such as deer, coyote, boar, and foxes.

=== Guarding ===
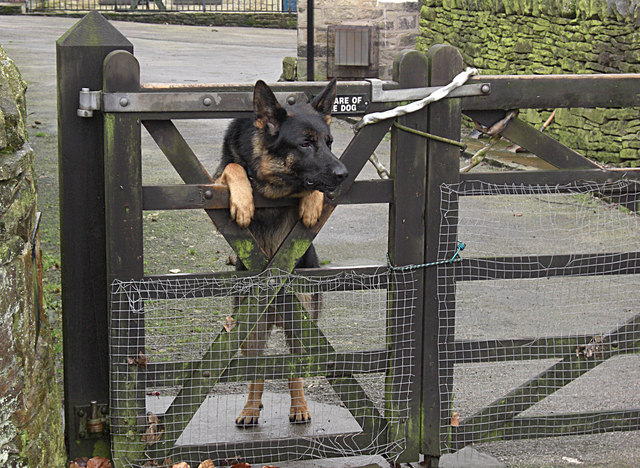
A German Shepherd dog guarding property

A guard dog or watchdog is a dog used to watch for and guard people or property against unwanted human or animal intruders.

Dogs have been used as guardians since ancient times. The ancient Romans placed Cave canem mosaics at the entrance of homes to warn visitors and intruders of the presence of dangerous dogs at the property.

=== Controlling vermin ===
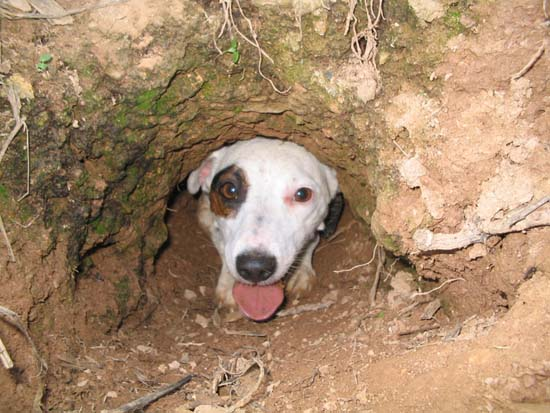
A working Jack Russell Terrier exits a den pipe.

Dogs may be used to hunt vermin. A working terrier is a type of terrier dog bred and trained to hunt vermin including a badger, fox, rat and other small mammals. This may require the working terrier pursuing the vermin into an underground warren.

A ratter is any dog used for catching and killing rats and similar vermin. Specialized rat-catching breeds are found in many countries. A typical ratter is small to medium-sized and has a short and smooth coat, however a wide range of dog breeds and landraces may be used.

=== Sledding ===
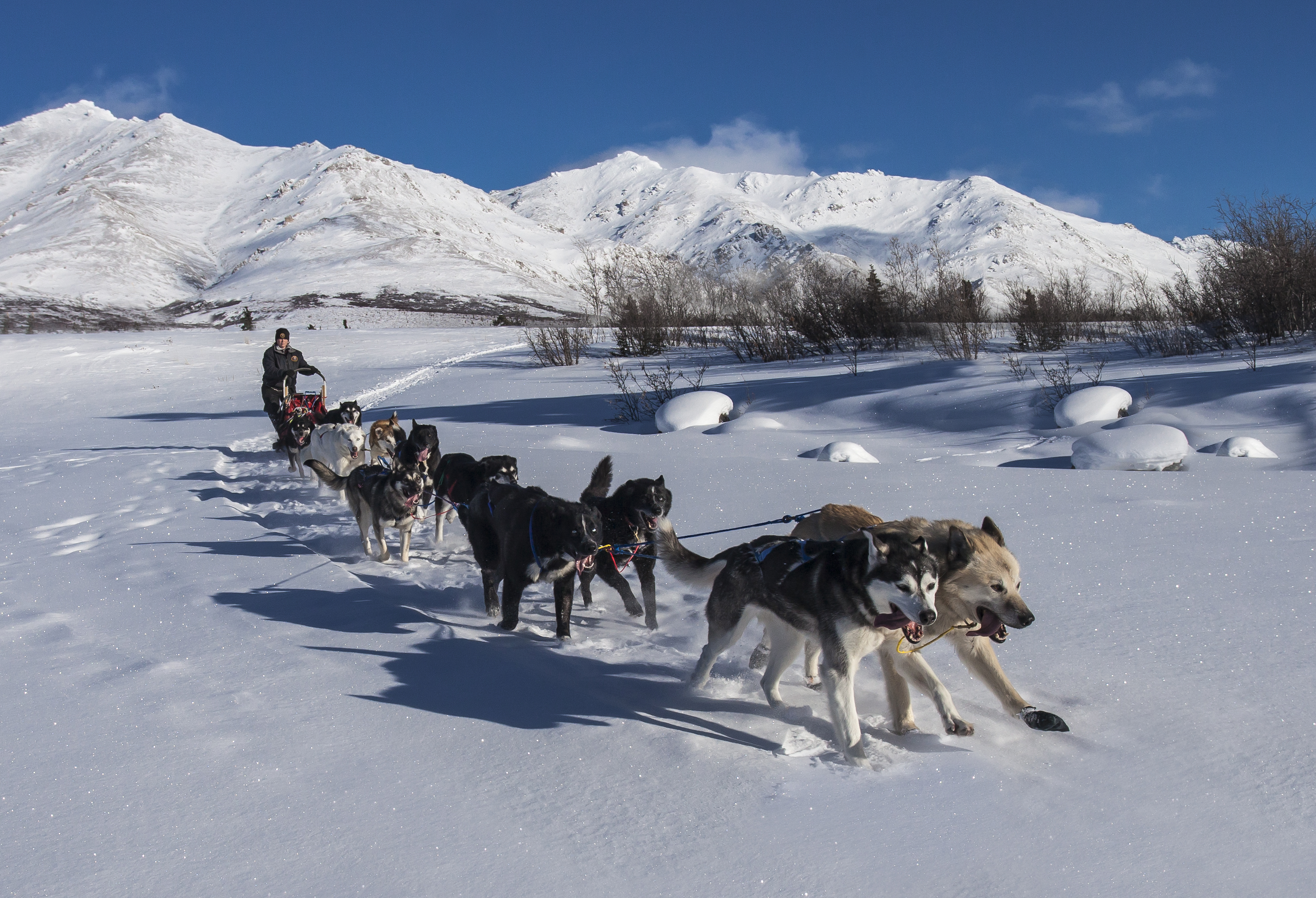
A sled dog team of 11 in Denali National Park and Preserve

Dog sledding began as a formal sport in North America in 1908, however the practice of using dogs to pull sleds dates back to at least 6000 BC. Remnants of sleds and harnesses has been found with canine remains in Siberia which carbon-dated to 7800–8000 years ago. A dog musher will need to develop a close bond sometimes with as many as 20 or more dogs in their kennel in order to keep a highly responsive and loyal team. The musher will need to cultivate a particularly strong relationship with their lead dog. The lead dog will ultimately decide which path the team takes.

=== Military ===
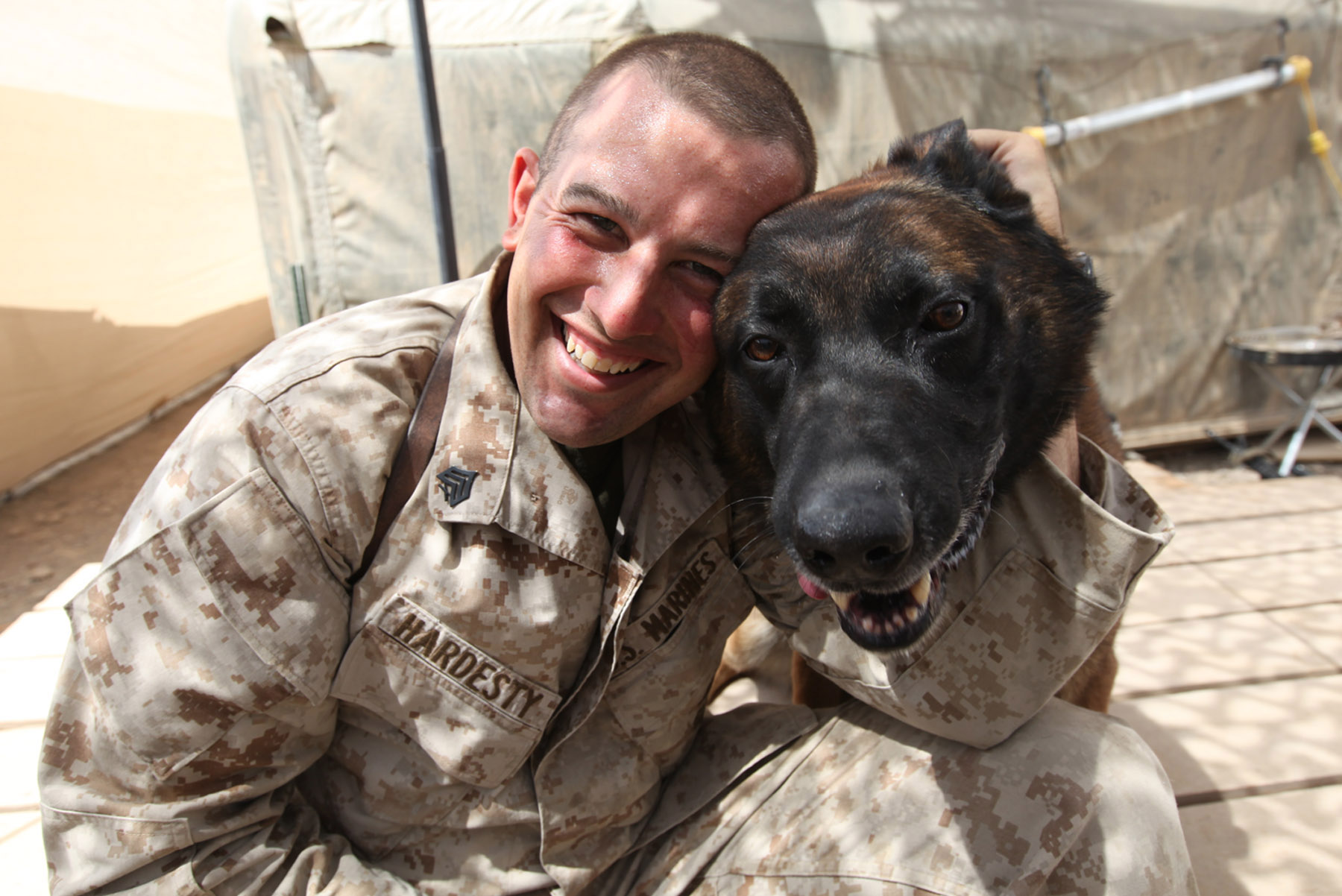
A combat tracker dog with his handler

Canines are employed worldwide in various militaries around the world where they perform a variety of jobs on land, sea, and in the air. In the United States of America the Army Veterinary Corps and the 341st Training Squadron provide the training and logistics for many of the handlers and canines. Lackland AFB has around 900 canines at any given time. The commander of the 341st Training Squadron, William Roberts, states their mission is "to produce a dog that patrols and detects, either narcotics or explosives". In the past, military working dogs in the US were often euthanized after they retired, especially if they were deemed unfit for home life or showed aggressive behaviors. However, today, the military makes every effort to adopt out these dogs to qualified families. Only dogs with serious medical conditions are euthanized.

In the UK the 1st Military Working Dog Regiment provides trained dogs and handlers to support the armed forces in various operations, comprising 299 Regular soldiers and officers with the ability to surge to a maximum capacity of 384 Military Working Dogs.

The relationship between a soldier and his dog is often cited as deeply rooted and unshakable, with the result being that the handler and the dog can read almost imperceptible changes in each other's body language. In the United States military, the working dog is traditionally one rank higher than his handler so that he is afforded the respect they deserve.

Examples of Military working dogs include:

- Guard dog
- Attack dog
- Mascot dog
- Detection dog
- Law Enforcement dog

=== Search ===
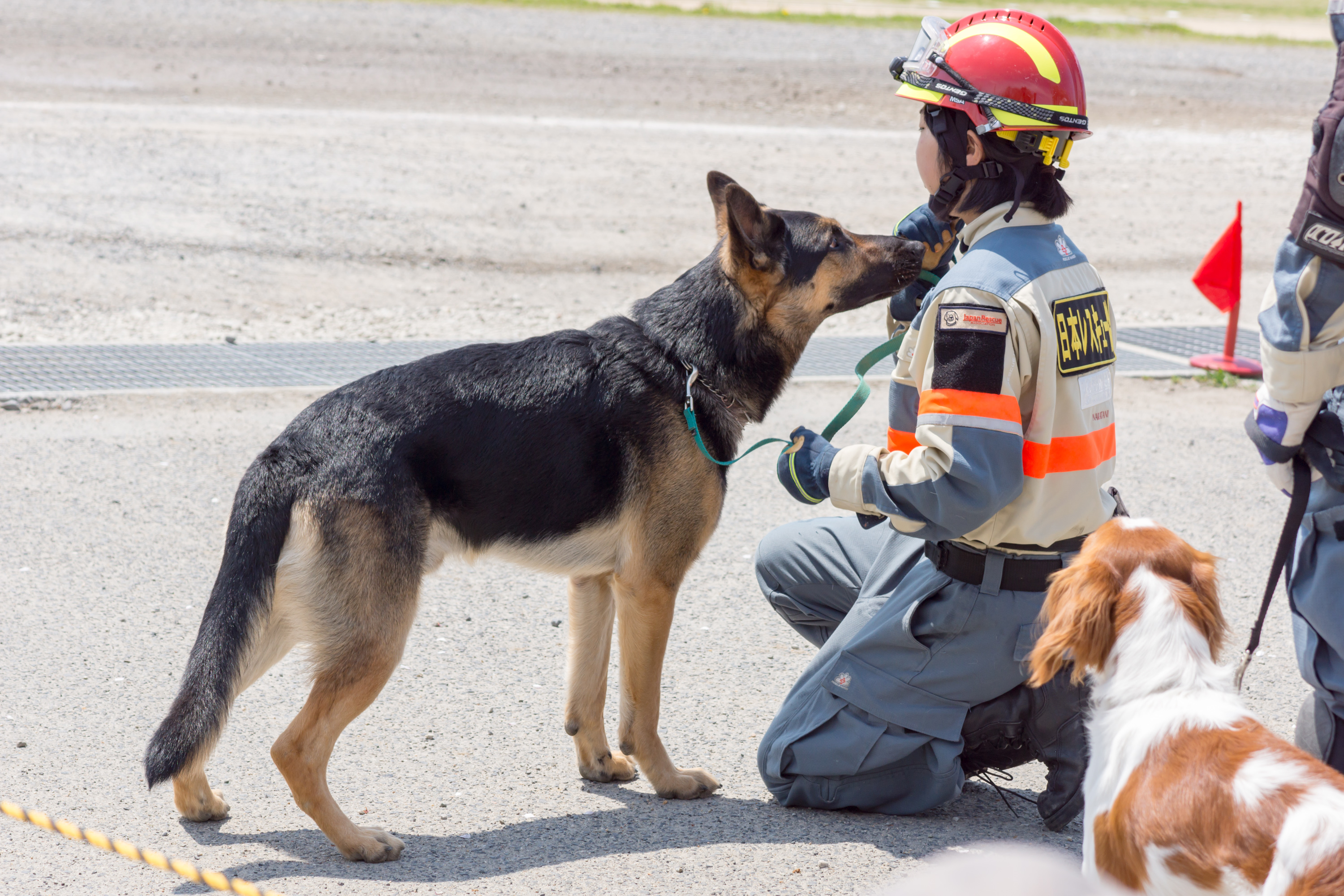
Search and rescue dog with handler

Because of their highly developed sense of smell, many canines today work with their handlers to search for many things, including drugs, invasive species, and people. The first search and rescue dogs were the Saint Bernards who were trained to locate lost or stranded travelers in the Swiss Alps.

Dogs and their handlers will have formed a close bond allowing each other to interpret each other's body language correctly leading to the successful detection of the desired object or person. Examples of body language to look for when the dog begins to "hit" on a scent cone are small pauses, tail flicks, and puffing air with the nose. Every dog is different and will present different signals that will take lots of dedicated training from the handler to learn how to correctly interpret.

=== Assistance ===
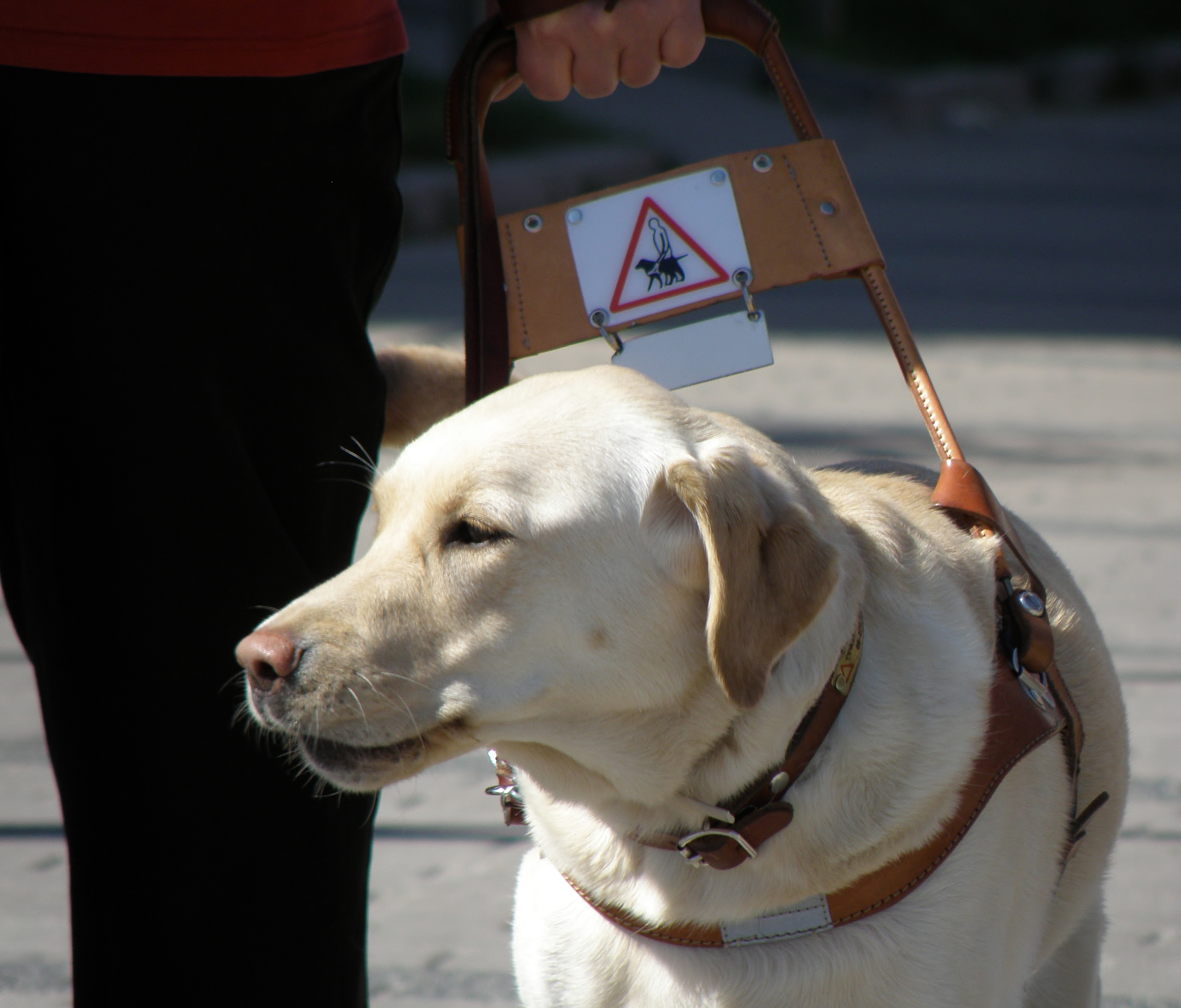
Assistance dog

People who suffer from isolation, depression, and other mental illness to the point where it significantly interferes with day-to-day life may find security in an emotional support animal, however it is important to remember that usually dogs who fall into the emotional support animal category do not require any specific training. As a result of the studies by Dr. Samuel Corson pets have become commonplace in nursing homes where they can provide comfort and affection to people. Therapy dogs are used in hospitals around the world where they can have a positive impact on a variety of diagnoses, including cancer.

Examples of assistance dogs include:

- Guide dogs
- Hearing dogs
- Mobility assistance dogs
- Medical response dogs
  - Seizure response dogs
  - Autism assistance dogs
  - Psychiatric response dogs

== Health benefits ==
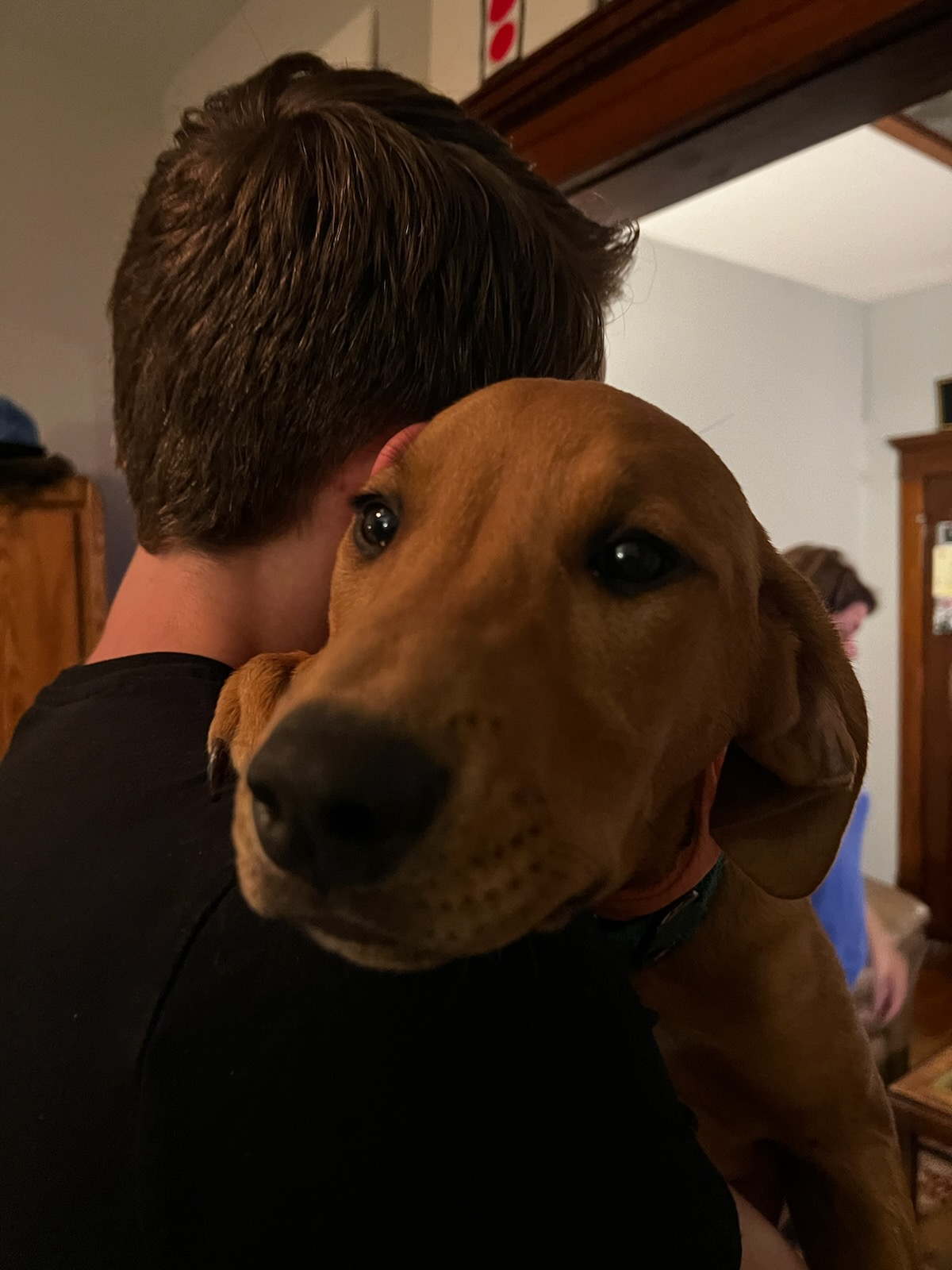
A dog companion in the arms of its human owner.

Canines' social impact on humans is especially significant for those who tend to be more isolated, such as children with no siblings or elderly persons. In this view, the animal is part of human community and an important determinant for psychological well-being.

According to self psychology, an animal can be a "self-object" that gives a sense of cohesion, support, or sustenance to a person's sense of self. Self-psychology explains why some animals are so crucial to a person's sense of self and well-being. Dog companionship often helps people to develop a daily routine and gives them something to look forward to each day. Studies also show owning a dog reduces stress, alleviates anxiety, and even can prolong a human's lifespan.

== Abuse ==
Despite the normally positive relationship, there are instances where dogs have turned on their owner or other humans. There are also instances where a normally positive relationship can result in a human abusing their canine, either psychologically or physically. The reasons for a human or a dog turning on their companion are diverse and poorly understood, but may be generally boiled down to improper socialization or underlying mental health issues for either party.

== See also ==
- Dog behavior
- List of individual dogs
- Anthrozoology
- Dogs in religion
- Biophilia hypothesis
- Cat–dog relationship
- Interspecies friendship
- Cultural depictions of dogs
- Origin of the domestic dog
- Pet humanization
- Human interaction with cats
