= Interspecies friendship =

Bond formed between animals of different species

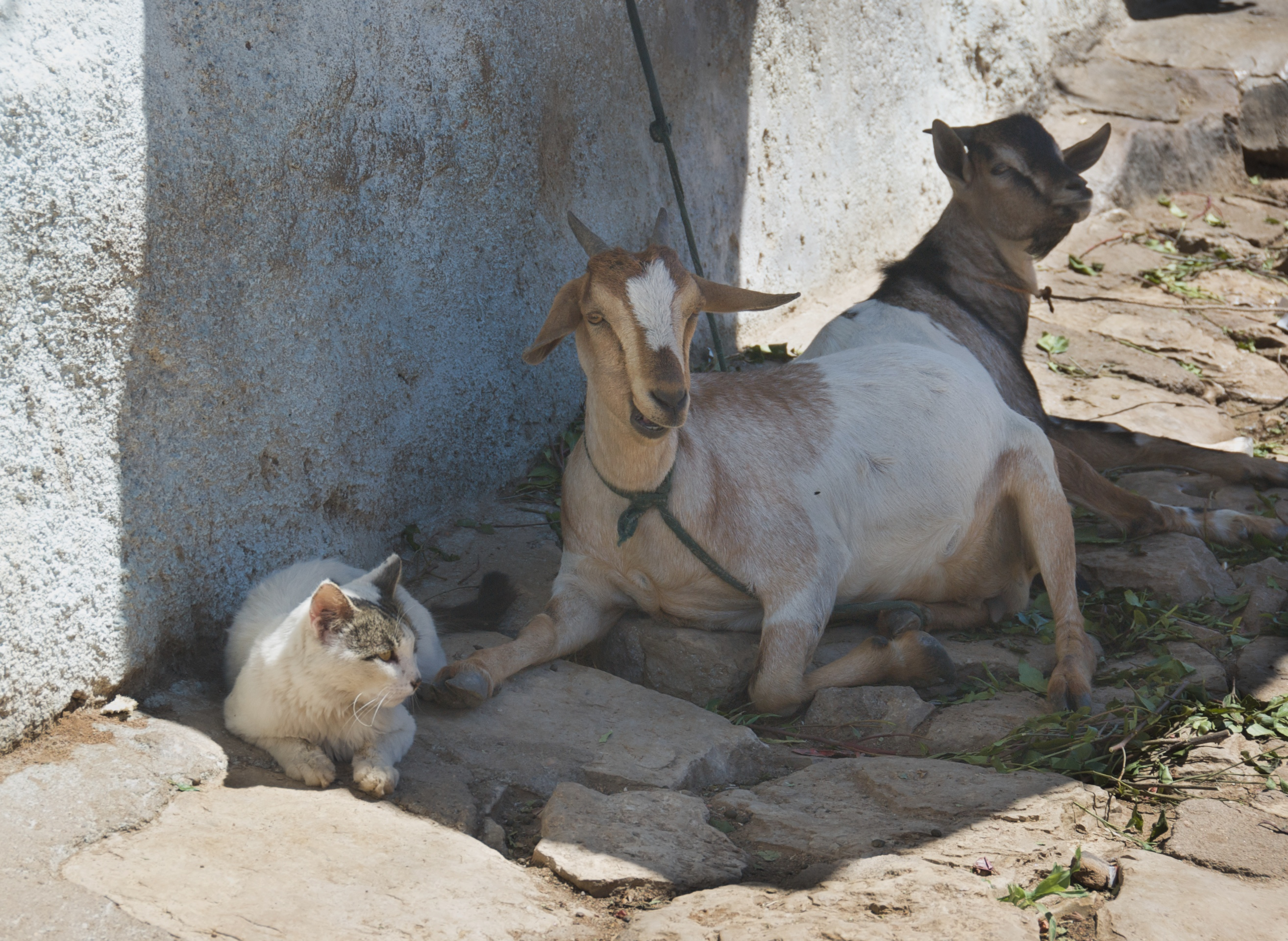
Two goats and a cat sitting in the shade

An interspecies friendship is an amical bond that is formed between animals of different species. Numerous cases of interspecies friendships among wild and domesticated animals have been reported and documented with photography and video. Domestication of animals has led to interspecies friendships between species that would never naturally exist together. In many cases of interspecies friendship, the species are not normally seen together, and sometimes, one is of a species that ordinarily preys on the other in nature.

The concept of interspecies friendship is similar to that of mutualism in that two individuals from different species exist in a relationship where each organism benefits from the activity of the other. Reasons for the formation of interspecies friendships include domestication, interspecies communication, mutually beneficial exchanges, desire for social bonding or protection.

== Friendships between humans and other animals ==
=== Dogs ===
The relationship between a human and a household dog (Canis lupus familiaris) is quite common and said to be similar to the relationship seen between a parent and child. Many people agree that there is an emotional bond between themselves and their dog. An important indicator of the bond between a dog and its caregiver can be seen through separation and reunion incidences. The behaviour of the dog including approach latency and the frequency of initiating physical contact varies according to how familiar the dog is with the person. This can be viewed as a snapshot of their relationship. Behaviours such as tail wagging, lip licking, body shaking and vocalization also indicate this.

The relationship between humans and dogs is so impactful that therapy dogs are a common practice. From hospitals to schools, dogs help comfort humans.

=== Cats ===
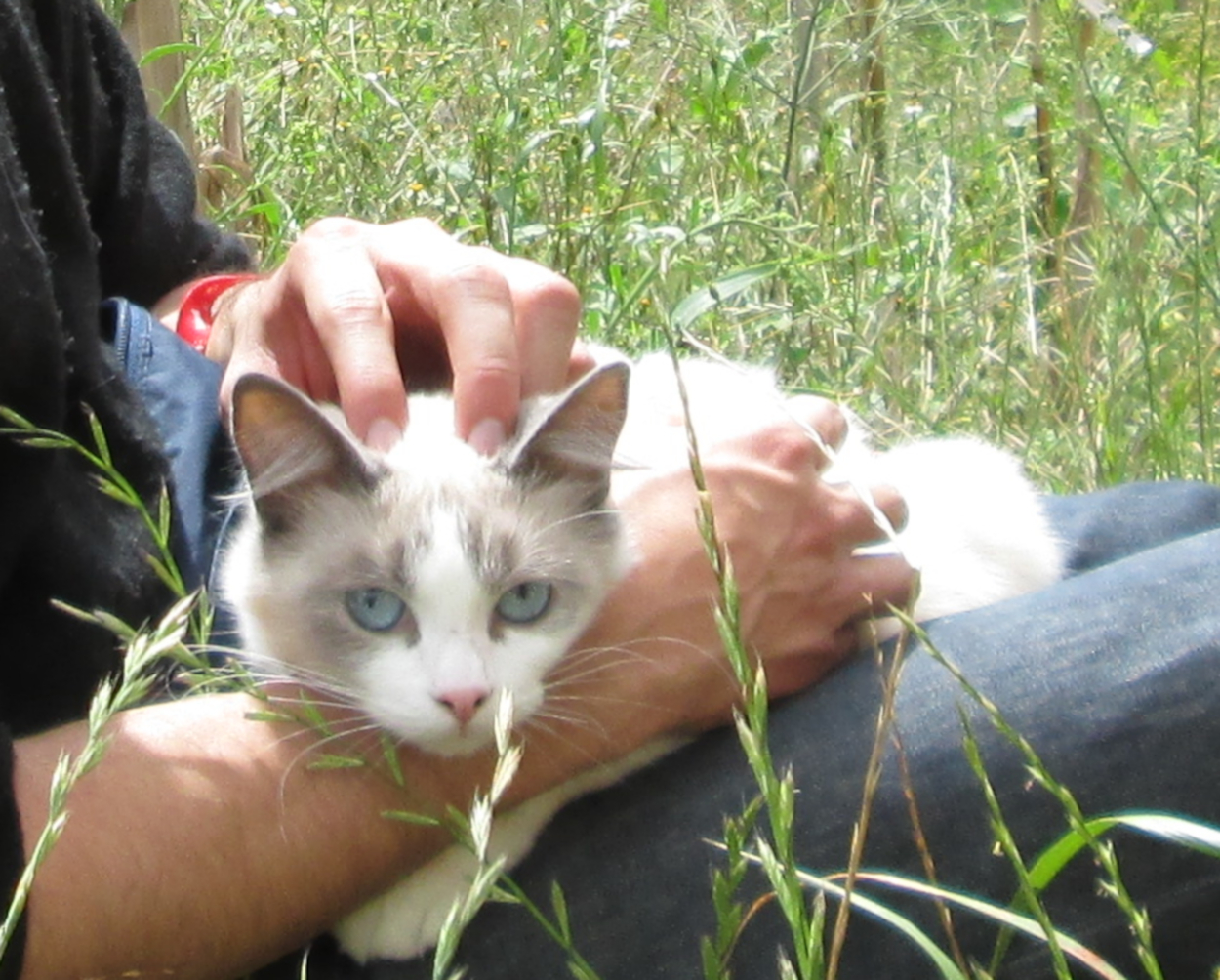
A human petting a cat

Friendships between household cats (Felis catus) and humans are also very common. The relationship between cats and humans dates back over 10,000 years. In ancient Egypt, where cats were venerated, they had great influence. Today, cats live in many countries and are the most popular choice of pet. Cat owners often consider their cat as an integrated part of their family and indicate that they are easy to care for and engage in social behaviours such as allowing humans to hold, pet and play with them. Mutual affection and bonding is displayed between cats and their owners, indicating a sense of friendship.

=== Horses ===
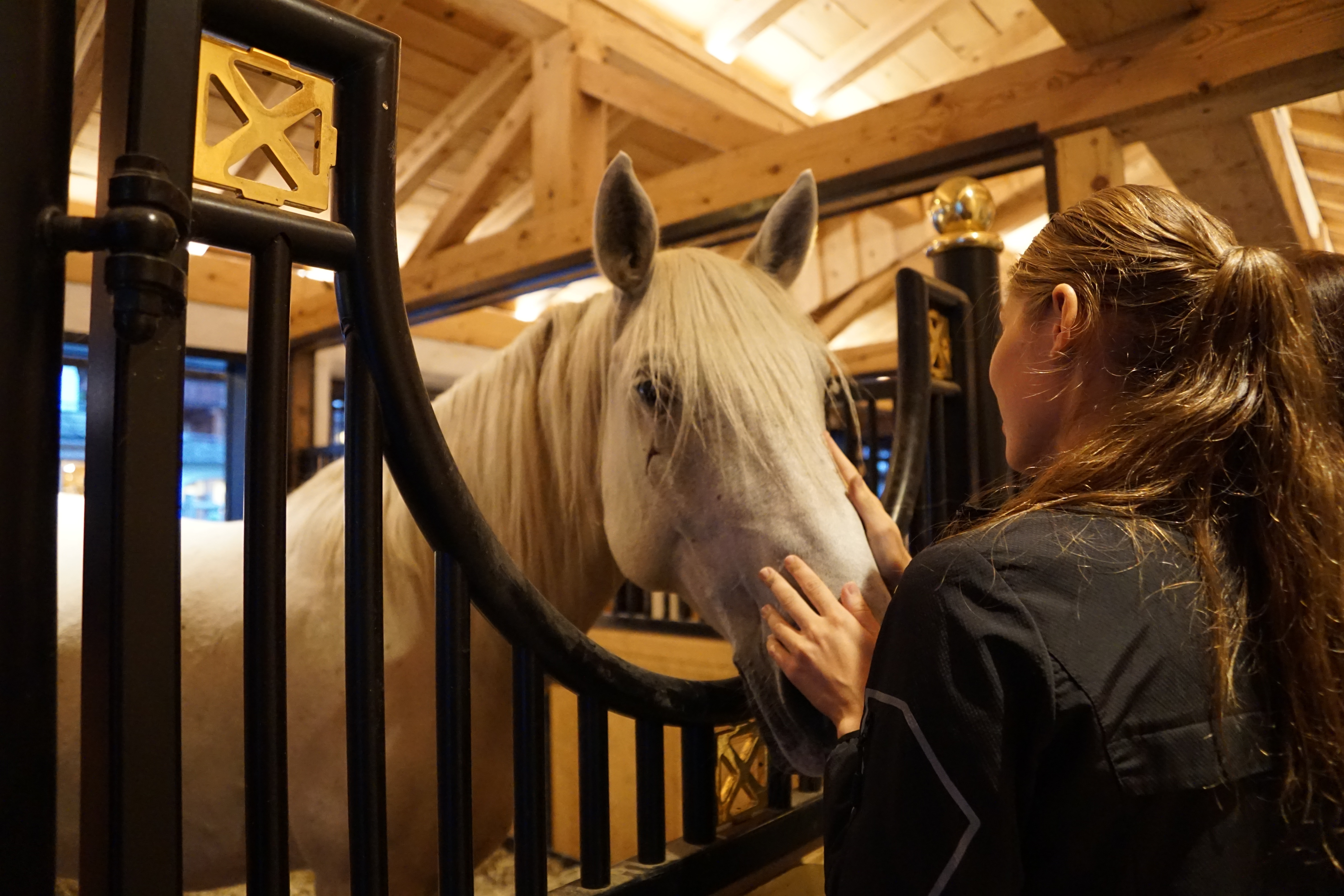
A human touching a horse's muzzle

Friendships between humans and domesticated horses are often observed and occur when the horse is willing to allow the person into its flight distance and personal space through friendly interactions such as grooming, scratching and rubbing. Horses are social animals and once a person is accepted into their personal space, they become a part of their social system. A domesticated horse will work hard for praise from its human partner and can be easily trained to respond to human commands. Many people report strong feelings of friendship with their horse and believe that their horse considers them to be its friend, protector, and caretaker.

=== Non-domesticated animals ===
Interspecies friendships have been displayed between humans and non-domesticated animals. Some examples include:

- The interspecies friendship between zoologist Dian Fossey and a group of gorillas. Fossey developed relationships with the gorillas she studied and after years of being away from them, they recognized and remembered her when she returned. After their reunion, the gorillas engaged in amicable behaviour with Fossey such as direct eye contact, sniffing, crooning, resting beside each other and embracing one another.
- The relationship between Barbara Smuts and a baboon troop. Over the course of many interactions between Smuts and the baboons, eventually the baboons treated her as if she was a part of their troop. Smuts would comfortably rest with them, exchange friendly glances and felt safe amongst them.
- Friendly encounters have been observed between gray whales and humans. Gray whales seem to enjoy when humans pat them alongside boats. During these human-whale interactions, the whales are generally timid and gentle.

== Friendships between non-human animals ==
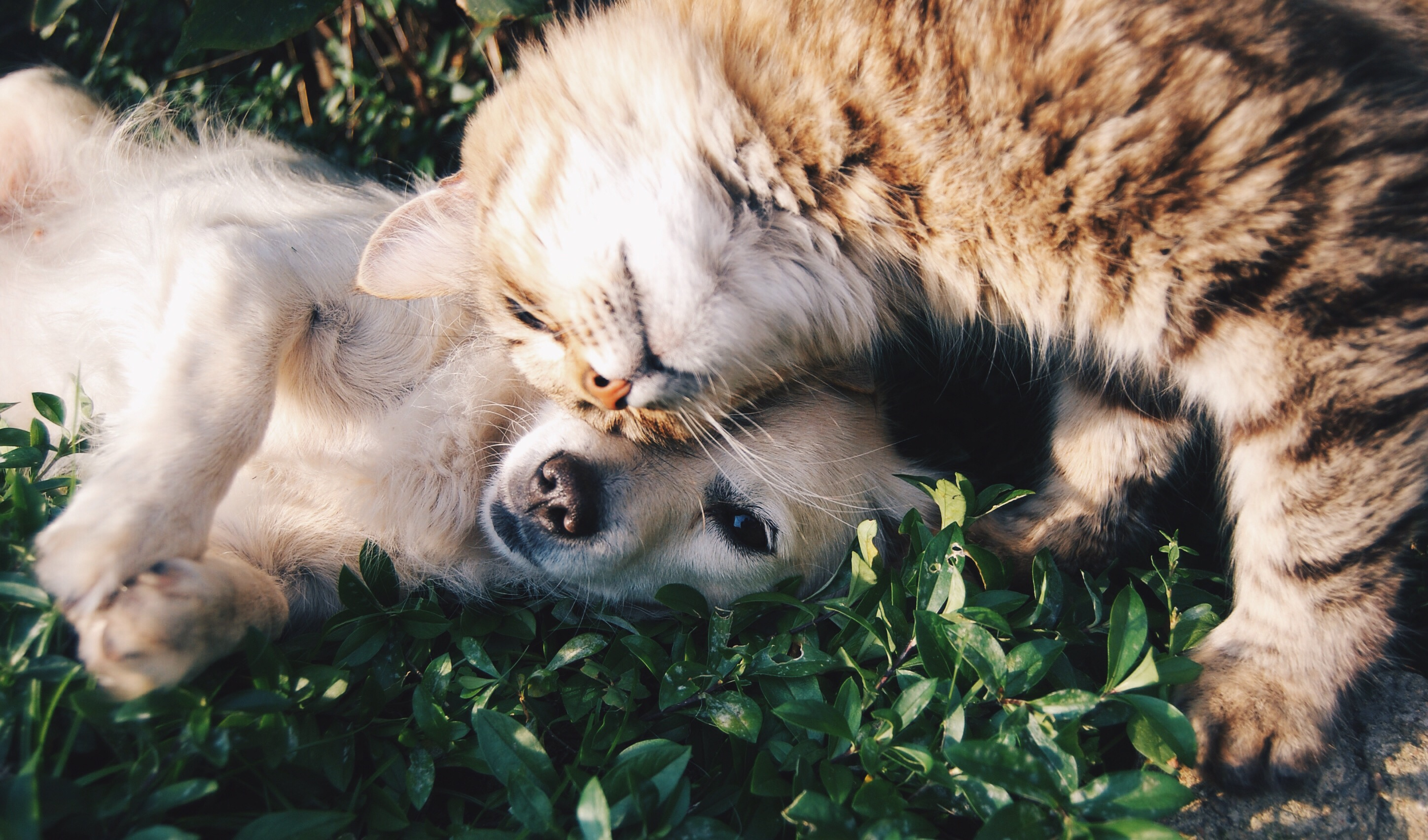
A cat and dog bonding

Dogs and cats that coexist in close quarters often display companionship to each other. Many coexisting dogs and cats exhibit behaviours such as playing and sleeping together, grooming each other and understanding differences in body language and communication. Dogs and cats often engage in mutual nose sniffing which is a form of greeting displayed in cats that is not normally observed in dogs. Dogs may acquire this behaviour from the understanding of cat communication signals.

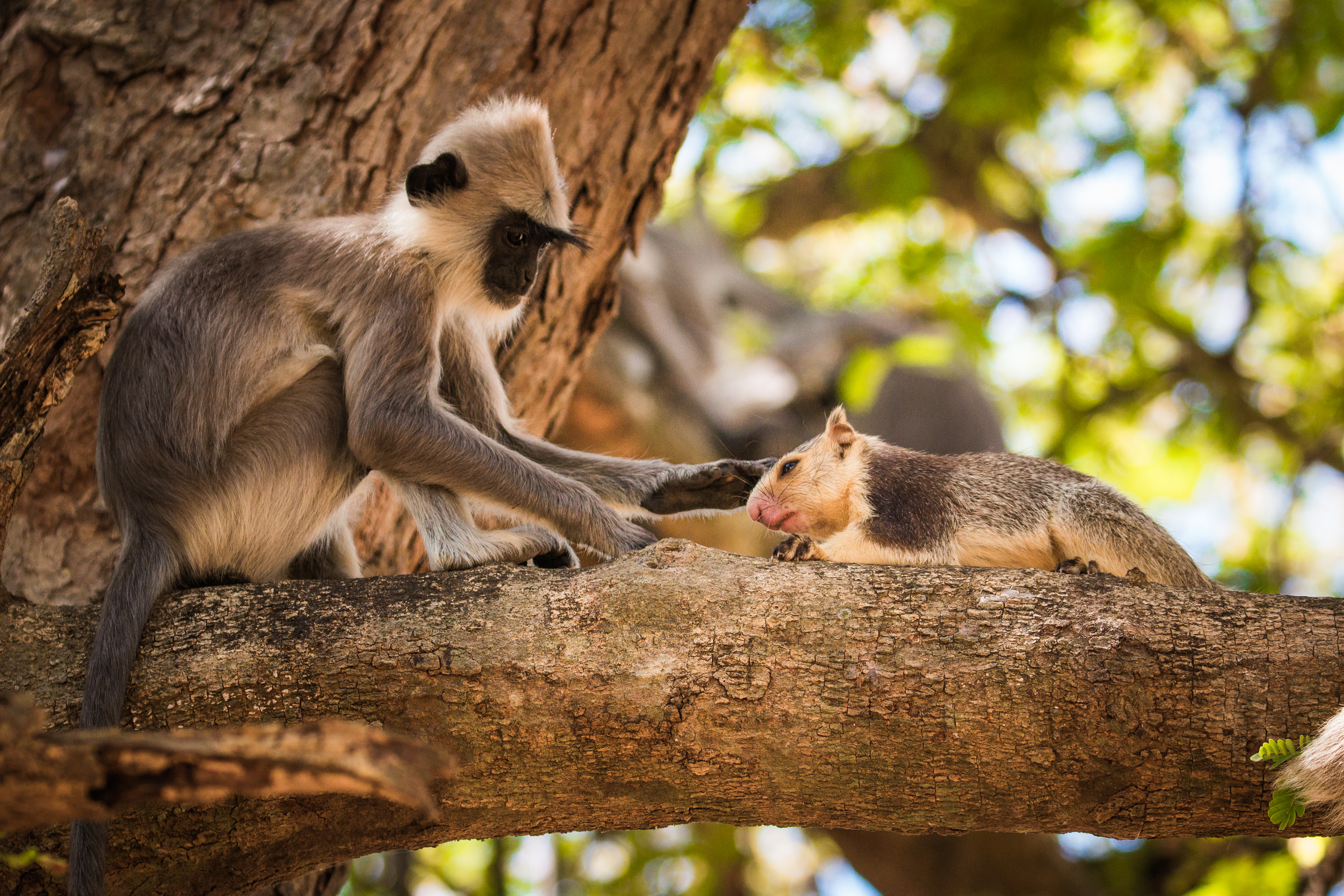
A Tufted gray langur (Semnopithecus priam) stroking a Grizzled giant squirrel (Ratufa macroura) caringly at Yala National Park, Sri Lanka

There are many documented instances of interspecies friendships, including that a long-billed curlew, whimbrel and marbled godwit kept each other company every winter in Vancouver for many years. Though coyotes often prey on badgers, the species can form mutualistic relationships when hunting ground squirrels, in which badgers dig into ground squirrel nests and nearby coyotes catch the ground squirrels that escape the site. Coyotes initiate this collaboration through friendly behaviours such as play-bowing, tail-wagging and scampering. Dogs have repeatedly been recorded befriending bears.

== Causes of interspecies friendships ==
=== Domestication ===
Domestication is defined as a multi-generational relationship in which one group of organisms assumes a significant degree of influence over the reproduction and care of another group to secure a more predictable supply of resources from that second group.

In the previous 11,000 years, humans have brought a wide range of species into domestication to use as livestock, working animals, household pets, and companions. The influence of human behaviour on domesticated animals has led to many species having learned to co-exist - sometimes leading to the formation of an interspecies friendship. For example, interspecies friendships are often observed in humans with their domesticated pets and in pets that live in the same household such as cats and dogs.

=== Interspecies communication ===
Species can communicate to each other both verbally and non-verbally as seen in human-dog communication. The communication exhibited between dogs and humans allow friendships to form which is often displayed through social bonding activities such as play. Interspecific communication is an effective way of forming mutuality and interspecies friendships in the wild which often involves different species warning each other about potential danger approaching. Species of monkeys have been observed to communicate with each other through their alarm calls leading to mutuality between the counterparts. In particular, West African Diana monkeys and Campbell's monkeys seem to understand and react to the alarm calls of the other species and form associations with each other through mutual protection.

=== Mutualism ===
Mutualism can contribute to the formation of interspecies friendships because it involves a pair of organisms experiencing mutually beneficial exchanges with each other which may lead to a long-lasting bond. The mutualistic relationship observed between coyotes and badgers after hunting ground squirrels together is an example of mutualism developing into an unlikely interspecies friendship. Interspecies friendships often form between humans and domesticated animals through mutualism in which the human gains something beneficial from their pet and the pet gains something beneficial from the human. This is often observed in human-canine friendships in which dogs benefit by being cared for and offered love and companionship from humans while humans benefit by receiving companionship, loyalty and love from their dogs. Mutualistic relationships can be observed even in the smallest of critters like ants and aphids. Ants deter predators from aphids and aphids produce honeydew for the ants to drink.

=== Protection ===
Protective behaviour exhibited from one species onto another can lead to an interspecies friendship as it allows the formation of a bond to occur between species. This can be observed in interspecies adoptions in which a member of one species "adopts" a member of another that is orphaned or hurt. For example, an infant marmoset was adopted by capuchin monkeys and the marmoset became socially included and protected in their group. Other examples include a ram protecting a blind cow and a steer protecting a blind mule.

=== Social bonding ===
Animals sometimes seek out social bonding with other species, often using play behaviours. Play can act as a form of communication between companions in which the participants mutually understand that the interaction is playful and pleasurable. Play is specifically fundamental to interactions between humans and their non-human companions such as play exhibited in human-canine bonding. Human-canine play requires that both the human and dog communicate to understand the situation and goal of the game through their actions. Social bonding is observed in many interspecies interactions such as those between humans and their household pets, humans and primates, and many other animals in the wild.

=== Canis lupus familiaris ===
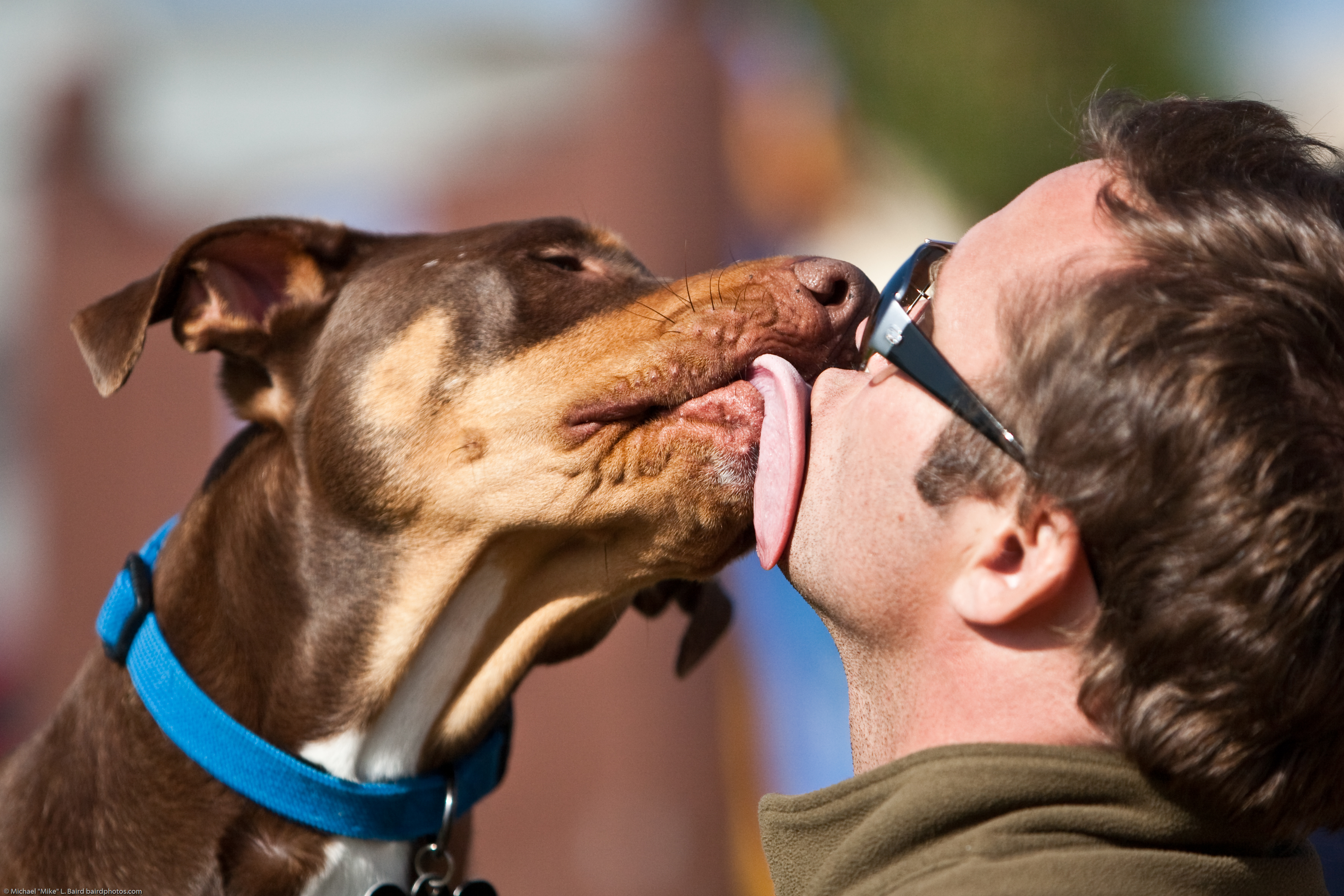
A reunion between a dog and a human

There is a wide range of shared general and specific social skills between humans and dogs including functional and behavioural traits. Sociality, the ability to perform synchronized behaviour and complex constructive skills have each been previously displayed in both dogs and humans. For example, qualities of sociality include lifelong attachment, reduced intra-group aggression, enhanced cooperation. Whereas, synchronized behaviours include imitation, hypnosis and dance and complex constructive skills include mimesis and language. Dogs display specific social skills during interaction with humans for their benefit. Advancement in attachment skills for the dogs enables them further benefit from humans by gaining valuable information, protection and help.

Animals that have evolved social skills gained close integration with humans and their community resulting in more successful species. Human-dog relationships are the most common interspecies friendships, resulting in dogs becoming one of the most successful mammalian species to exist.

== See also ==
- A Moose for Jessica – 1987 non-fiction children's book
- Cat–dog relationship – Interaction between the main house pets
- Human–canine bond – Interspecies relationship
- Human interaction with cats – Interspecies relationship
- Man's best friend – Common phrase referring to domestic dogs
- Pet humanization – Applying care to pets that approaches human standards
- Symbiosis – Ecological interaction between taxa
