= Pet humanization =

Applying care to pets that approaches human standards

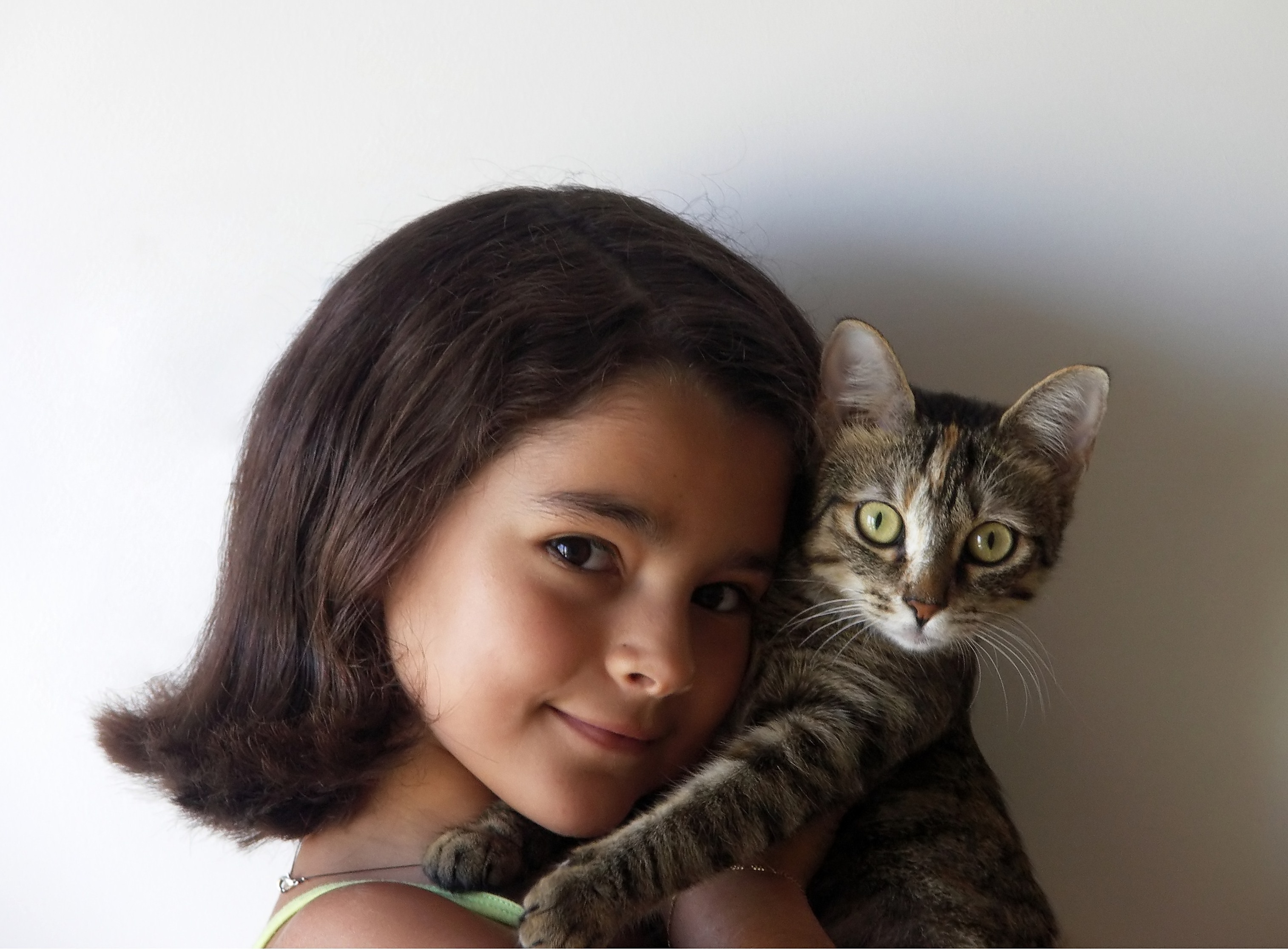
Girl with a young cat

Pet humanization is the practice in pet culture of treating companion animals with a high level of care and attention approaching human family members. The trend extends throughout history, including Ancient Greece, in which graves are found with sincere epitaphs to dogs, similar to human graves.

To the extent that the treatment involves providing for the pet beyond their means of appreciation, it is considered to be a form of anthropomorphism though the limits of this remain an open topic. For example, anthropomorphism is more common among dog owners versus other pet owners in Romania.

== History ==
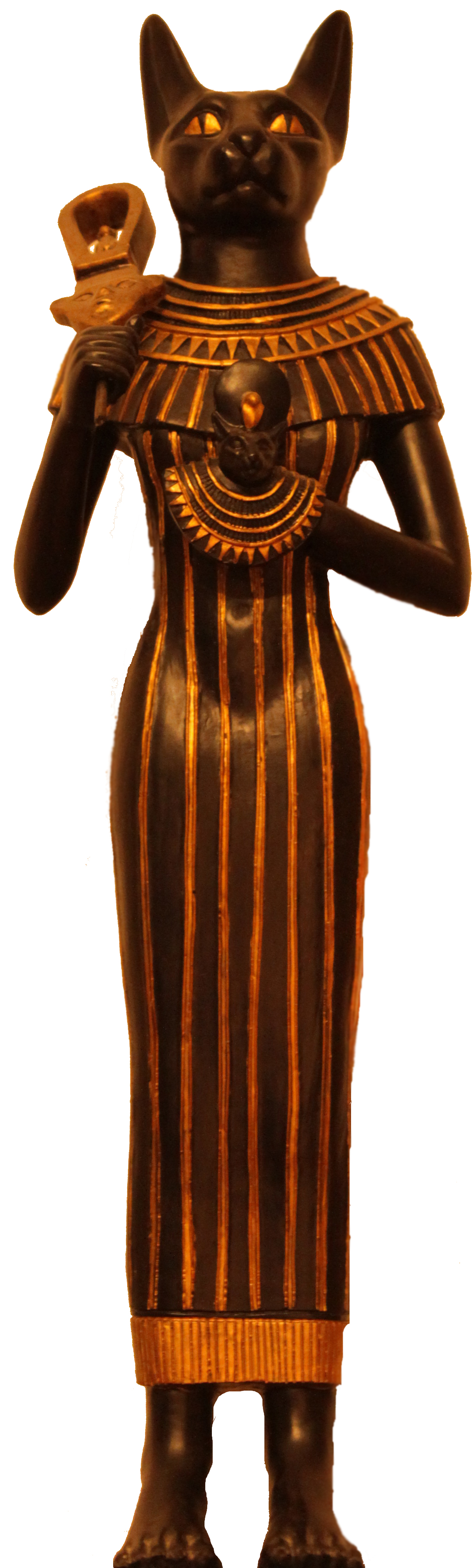
Bastet, half cat and half human

In many ancient civilizations, people formed close bonds with animals, often using them for various purposes like hunting, protection, companionship, and animal worship. For example, some cats in ancient Egypt were considered sacred animals and were personified with the deity Bastet, and provided with elaborate burials. Dogs in religion hold various symbolic and cultural meanings across different religions and belief systems. After looking at pre-Columbian Colima statues of dogs, a museum educator from the natural history museums of Los Angeles County, California argues that "the dogs of Mesoamerica had a complex relationship with humans and were often seen as equals that served important roles and functions in everyday life."

In the 1st century, the Roman people were known for treating their animals "as family members" and constructing careful graves for them. In the mid-18th century, the phrase "dog is man's best friend" was coined by the Frederick the Great, King of Prussia. In the mid-20th century, the pet industry expanded, offering a wide range of products and services. This included the development of specialized pet foods, veterinary medicine, grooming services, and even luxury items.

== Modern trends ==
Owners may prioritize premium or organic pet food, special diets and preparing homemade meals for their pets. Pets receive regular check-ups, vaccinations and access to veterinary medicine that were previously uncommon. Owners may supply their pets with a wide variety of accessories such as clothing, collars, leashes and designer items. In addition, luxurious pet accommodations, such as elaborate pet beds or specialized pet furniture are now available. Pets may have birthdays celebrated with parties, special treats and social gatherings. Pet-friendly accommodations and travel arrangements are made for vacations or trips.

Some pet owners create social media profiles for their pets, submitting facetious posts and interactions on their behalf. In modern times, owners often form deep emotional bonds with their pets, considering them as a family member, seeking companionship and emotional support from them.

== Human psychology ==
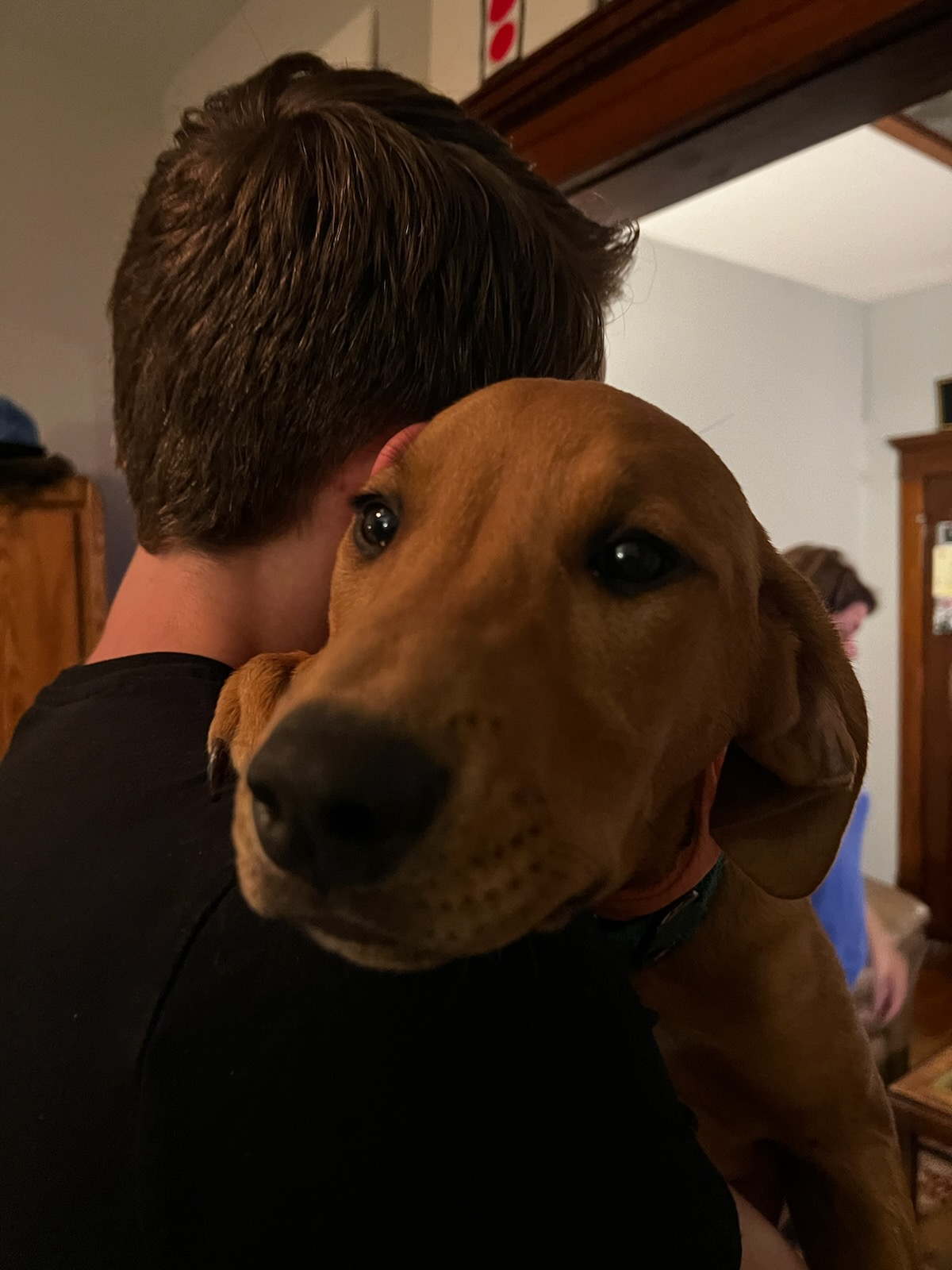
A dog in the arms of its human owner

The psychology behind pet humanization involves understanding the motivations, emotions and behaviours that drive individuals to treat their pets as valued members of the family or even as surrogate companions. Humans have a natural inclination to form emotional bonds with other living beings and pets often provide unconditional love, companionship, and a sense of belonging. This emotional connection can lead to the desire to provide the best possible care and attention for pets.

== Pet food industry ==
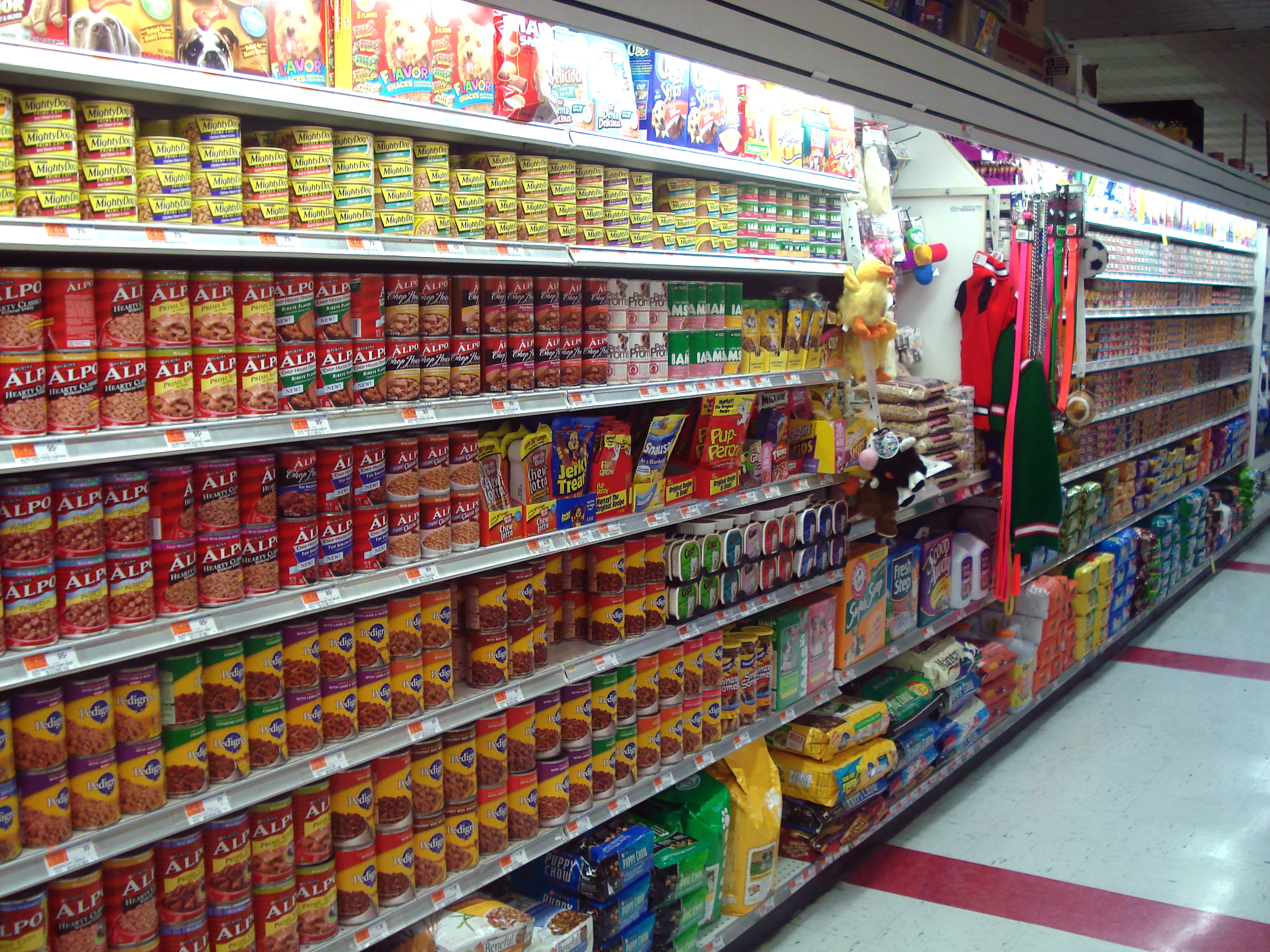
A supermarket's pet food aisle in Brooklyn, New York

Pet humanization has a significant impact on the pet food industry, leading to changes in consumer behaviour, product offerings and marketing strategies. As pet owners increasingly view their pets as integral members of their families, they seek out higher quality and more specialized food options for their pet companions. Pet owners who humanize their pets often seek pet foods made with high-quality, natural and wholesome ingredients. This includes "grain-free" pet food, which was investigated by the FDA as potentially causing dilated cardiomyopathy in dogs. For dogs, food may include berries and other human-like foods, which can potentially negatively influence protein intake.

== Pet healthcare ==
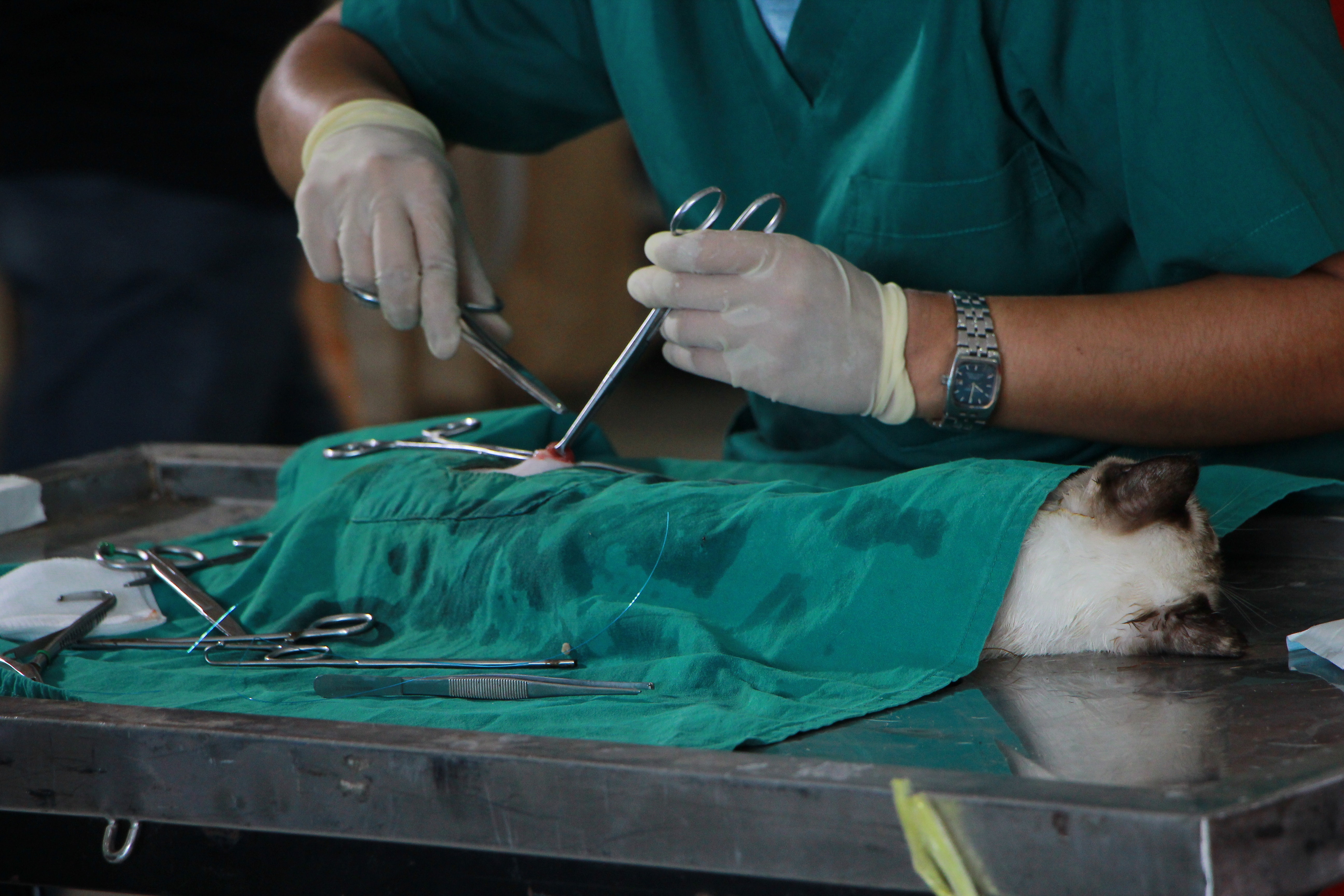
A veterinarian conducts surgery on a domestic cat.

Pet humanization has had an influence on the healthcare of pets, leading to changes in how pet owners approach veterinary care, especially among younger pet owners. The growth of pet insurance is considered a component of pet humanization, as it reflects the growing trend of treating pets as members of the family by financially supporting access to health care services similar to that of humans. In 2024, 6.4 million pets were insured in the United States, a 20.7% increase over the previous year.

== Pet bereavement ==
Pet bereavement and pet humanization are two concepts that are closely related and often intersect in the realm of human-pet relationships. Pet bereavement is the emotional response that pet owners experience when their pets die. It involves a range of emotions similar to the mourning process for a human loved one. In contemporary times, owners may chose to have beloved pets interned in a pet cemetery.

== See also ==
- Animal cognition
- Animal rights – Rights belonging to animals
- Biophilia hypothesis – Idea that humans innately seek connections with the natural world
- Blessing of animals – Ceremonial blessing of companion, agricultural, or working animals
- Companion dog – Dog intended as a human companion
- Ethnobiology – Study of how living things are used by human cultures
- Human–animal communication – Verbal and non-verbal interspecies communication
- Human–canine bond – Interspecies relationship
- Human interaction with cats
- Interspecies friendship – Bond formed between animals of different species
- Man's best friend – Common phrase referring to domestic dogs
- Mutualism – Mutually beneficial interaction between species
- Symbiosis – Ecological interaction between taxa
