= Man's best friend =

Common phrase referring to domestic dogs

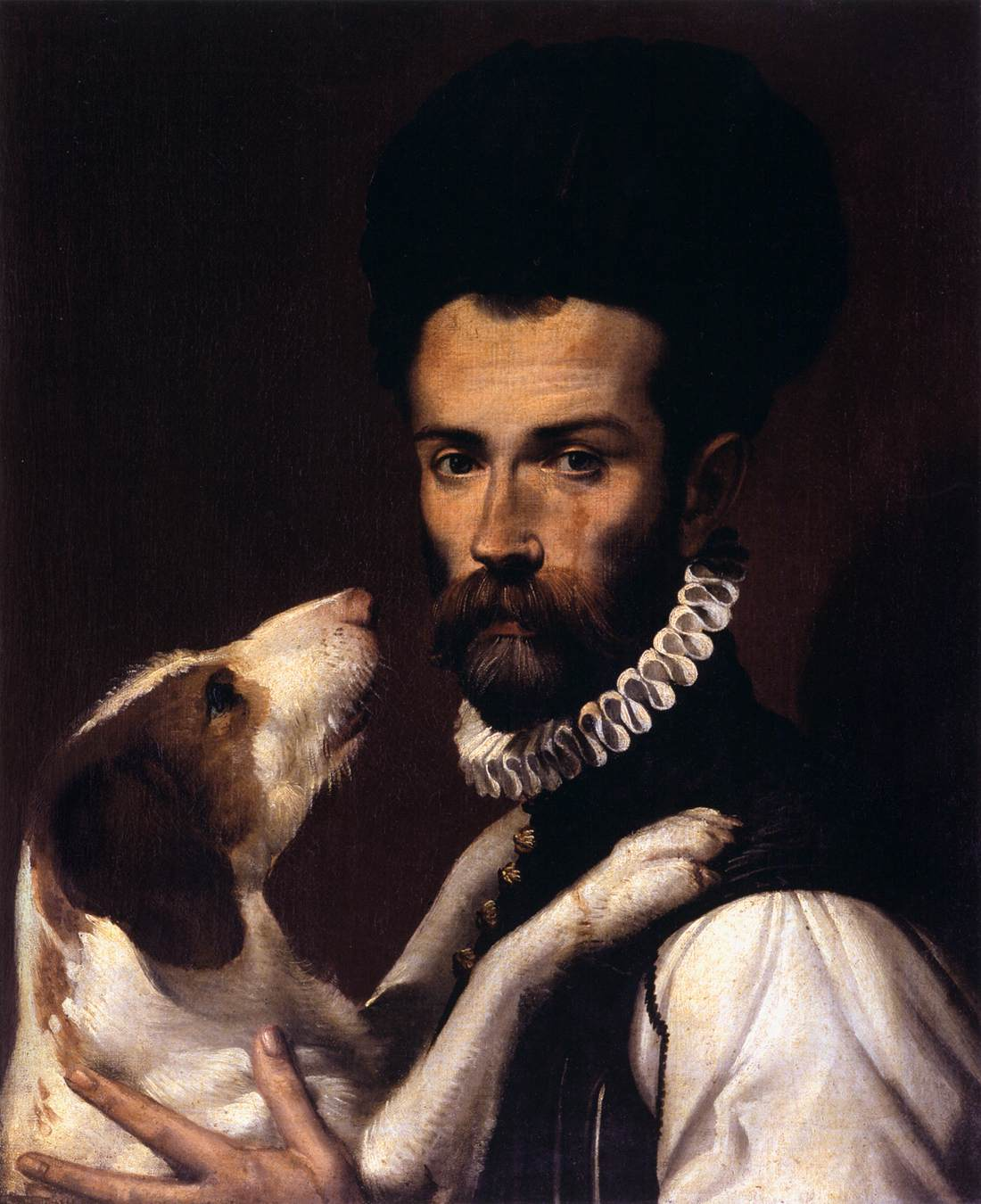
The dog is often called man's best friend.

"Man's best friend" is a common title given to domestic dogs, referring to their multi-millennia-long history of close relations, loyalty, friendship, and companionship with humans. The first recorded use of a related phrase is by Frederick the Great of Prussia. It was likely popularized by its use in a poem by Ogden Nash and has since become a common colloquialism.

Before the 19th century, breeds of dogs (other than lap dogs) were largely functional. They performed activities such as hunting, tracking, watching, protecting and guarding; and language describing the dog often reflected these roles. According to the Oxford English Dictionary, "In the oldest proverbs and phrases dogs are rarely depicted as faithful or as man's best friend, but as vicious, ravening, or watchful." Beginning in the 18th century, multiplying in the 19th and flourishing in the 20th century, language and attitudes towards dogs began to shift.

== Origins ==
A statement describing a dog as being a man's best friend was first recorded as being made by Frederick II, King of Prussia (1740–1786). Frederick referred to Biche, one of his Italian Greyhounds, as his best friend.

In his Dictionnaire philosophique (1764), Voltaire wrote:

CHIEN. — Il semble que la nature ait donné le chien à l'homme pour sa défense et pour son plaisir. C'est de tous les animaux le plus fidèle : c'est le meilleur ami que puisse avoir l'homme.

Translated, this reads:

DOG. — It seems that nature has given the dog to man for his defense and for his pleasure. Of all the animals it is the most faithful: it is the best friend man can possibly have.

The earliest citation in the US is traced to a poem by C.S. Winkle printed in The New-York Literary Journal, Volume 4, 1821:

The faithful dog – why should I strive
To speak his merits, while they live
In every breast, and man's best friend
Does often at his heels attend.

In 1870, in Warrensburg, Missouri, George Graham Vest represented a farmer suing for damages after his dog, Old Drum, had been shot and killed. During the trial, Vest stated that he would "win the case or apologize to every dog in Missouri." His closing argument to the jury made no reference to any of the testimony offered during the trial, and instead offered a eulogy of sorts. Vest's "Eulogy of the Dog" is one of the most enduring passages of purple prose in American courtroom history (only a partial transcript has survived). It began:

Gentlemen of the jury: The best friend a man has in this world may turn against him and become his enemy. His son or daughter that he has reared with loving care may prove ungrateful. Those who are nearest and dearest to us, those whom we trust with our happiness and our good name, may become traitors to their faith. The money that a man has, he may lose. It flies away from him, perhaps when he needs it the most. A man's reputation may be sacrificed in a moment of ill-considered action. The people who are prone to fall on their knees to do us honor when success is with us may be the first to throw the stone of malice when failure settles its cloud upon our heads. The one absolutely unselfish friend that a man can have in this selfish world, the one that never deserts him and the one that never proves ungrateful or treacherous is his dog. ...

Vest won the case (the jury awarded $50 to the dog's owner) and also won its appeal to the Missouri Supreme Court. In 1958, a statue of Old Drum was erected on the Johnson County Courthouse lawn containing a summation of Vest's closing speech, "A man's best friend is his dog."

In 1941, Ogden Nash wrote "An Introduction to Dogs," beginning:

The dog is man's best friend.
He has a tail on one end.
Up in front he has teeth.
And four legs underneath.

== Argos and Odysseus ==
In Homer's Odyssey (c. 8th century BC), upon Odysseus' (or Ulysses) return disguised as a beggar, his dog Argos is the only individual to recognize him.

As they [Eumaeus and Ulysses] were thus talking, a dog that had been lying asleep raised his head and pricked up his ears. This was Argos, whom Ulysses had bred before setting out for Troy, but he had never had any work out of him. In the old days he used to be taken out by the young men when they went hunting wild goats, or deer, or hares, but now that his master was gone he was lying neglected on the heaps of mule and cow dung that lay in front of the stable doors till the men should come and draw it away to manure the great close; and he was full of fleas. As soon as he saw Ulysses standing there, he dropped his ears and wagged his tail, but he could not get close up to his master. When Ulysses saw the dog on the other side of the yard, dashed a tear from his eyes without Eumaeus seeing it ...

— Ulysses and Eumaeus, in Samuel Butler, Odyssey, Book XVII

== See also ==
- Interspecies friendship – Bond formed between animals of different species
- Pet humanization – Applying care to pets that approaches human standards
