= Human interaction with cats =

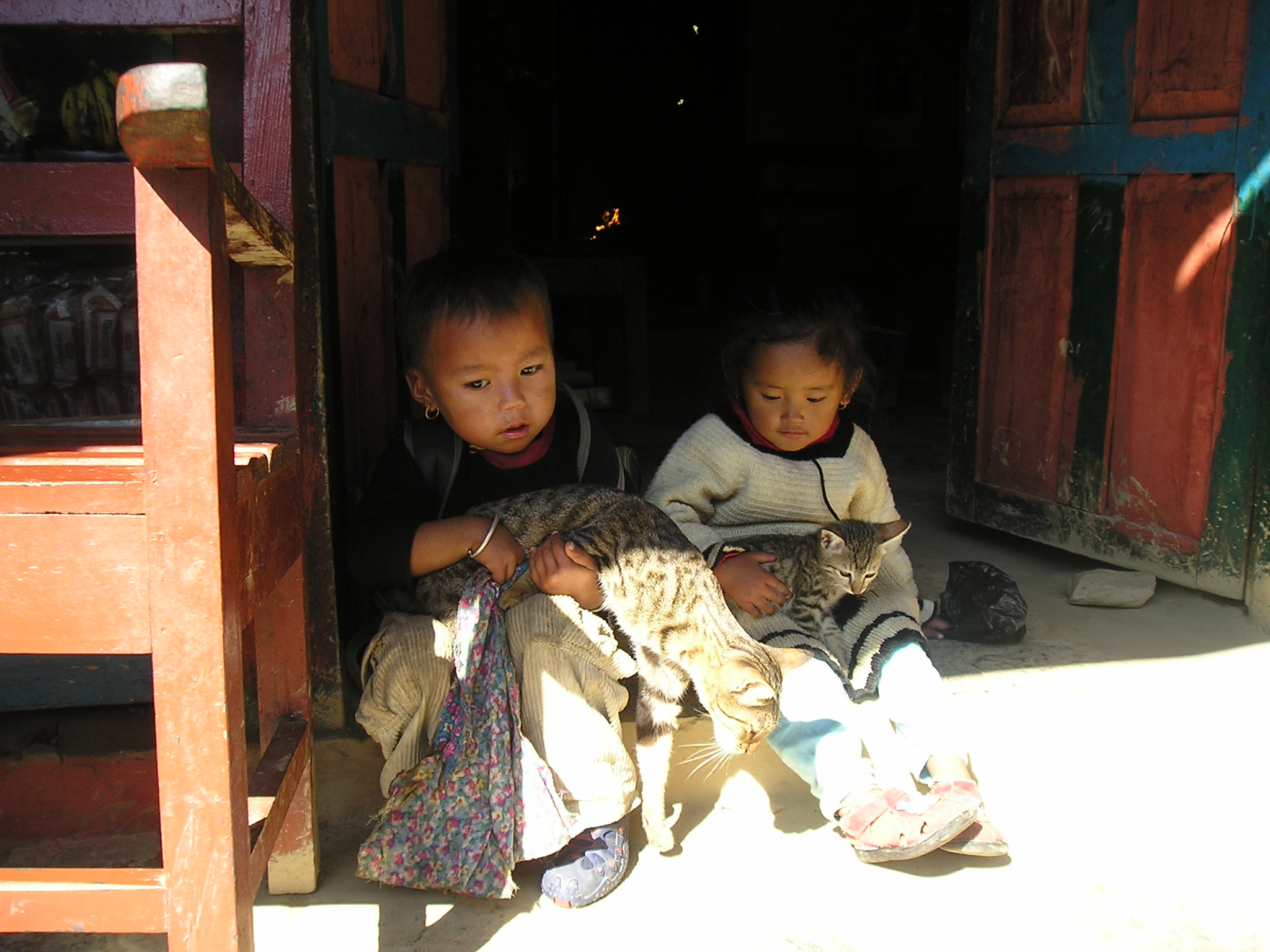
Nepalese children with cats

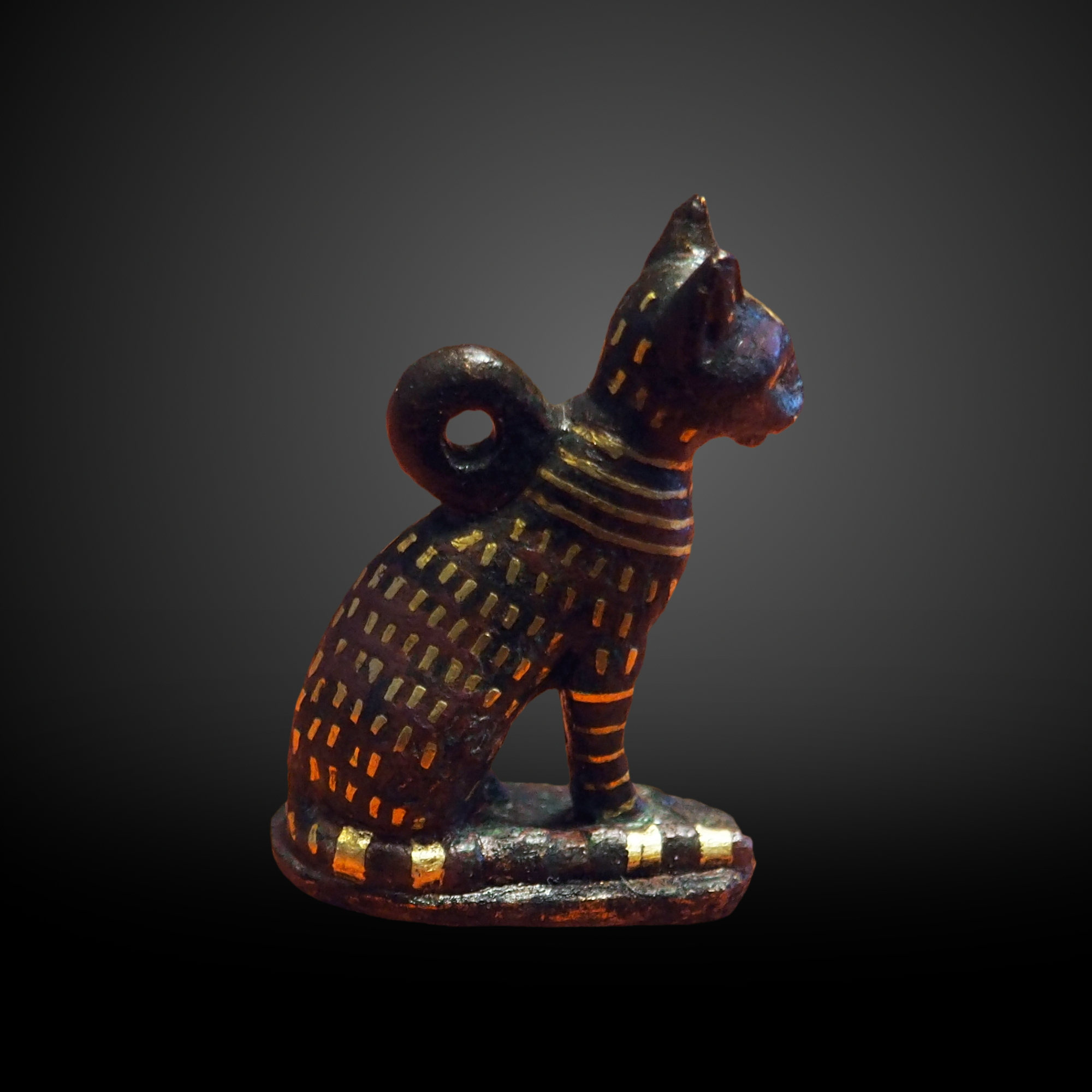
Ancient Egyptian cat amulet. Cats in Ancient Egypt played an important cultural role.

Human interaction with cats relates to the hundreds of millions of cats that are kept as pets around the world. Cats were originally domesticated thousands of years ago for their ability to control pests and later became companions to humans. Despite their independent nature, cats enjoy human company. Cats communicate through vocalizations, body language and behaviors, forming strong bonds with their human owners. Owners provide food, shelter, medical care, play, and enrichment activities which improve their physical and mental well-being.

== Pets ==
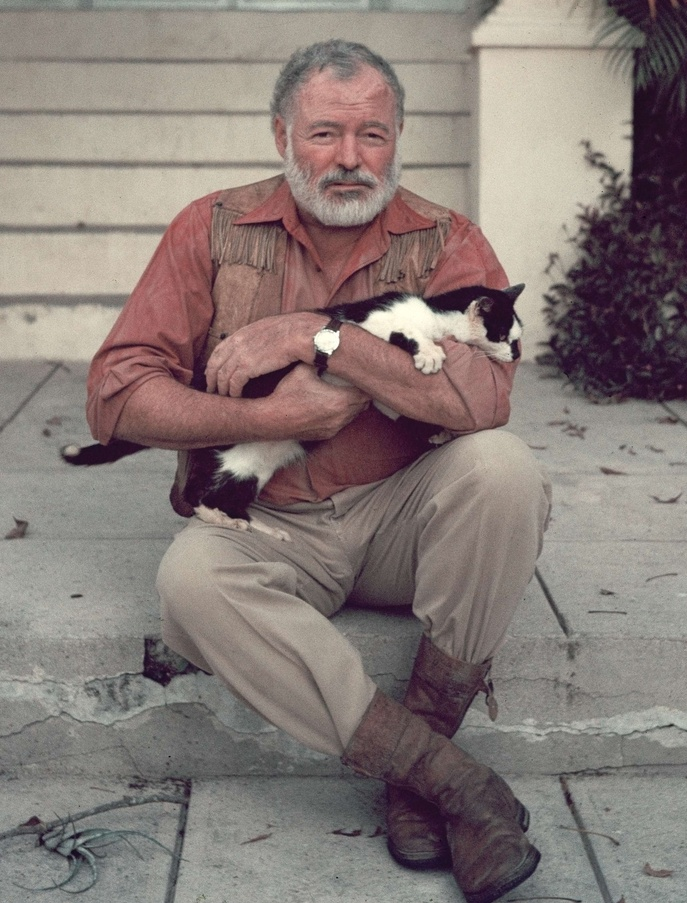
Ernest Hemingway with a cat

Cats are common pets in all continents of the world permanently inhabited by humans, and their global population is difficult to ascertain, with estimates ranging from anywhere between 200 million to 600 million. In 1998 there were around 76 million cats in Europe, 7 million in Japan and 3 million in Australia. A 2007 report stated that about 37 million US households owned cats, with an average of 2.2 cats per household giving a total population of around 82 million; in contrast, there are about 72 million pet dogs in that country. Cats exceeded dogs in number as pets in the United States in 1985 for the first time, in part because the development of cat litter in the mid-20th century eliminated the unpleasantly powerful smell of cat urine.

A 2007 Gallup poll reported that men and women in the United States of America were equally likely to own a cat. The ratio of pedigree/purebred cats to random-bred cats varies from country to country. However, generally speaking, purebreds are less than 10% of the total population.

As of 2021 in the United States, human owners of cats typically keep cats indoors at all times. In typically rural settings, cats oftentimes live outside and are used as a deterrent to rodents, snakes, and other pests. In the United Kingdom most cats go outdoors from time to time, with 26% being indoors at all times.

The compulsive hoarding of cats, a symptom of obsessive compulsive disorder (OCD), has long been associated with cat ladies although there is no evidence that older women are more likely than other people to hoard cats.

== Fur ==
According to the Humane Society of the United States, as well as being kept as pets, cats are also used in the international fur trade. Cat fur is used in coats, gloves, hats, shoes, blankets and stuffed toys. About 24 cats are needed to make a cat fur coat. This use has now been outlawed in several countries, including the United States, Australia and the European Union countries. However, despite being outlawed, some cat furs are still made into blankets in Switzerland as folk remedies that are believed to help rheumatism.

== Pest control ==
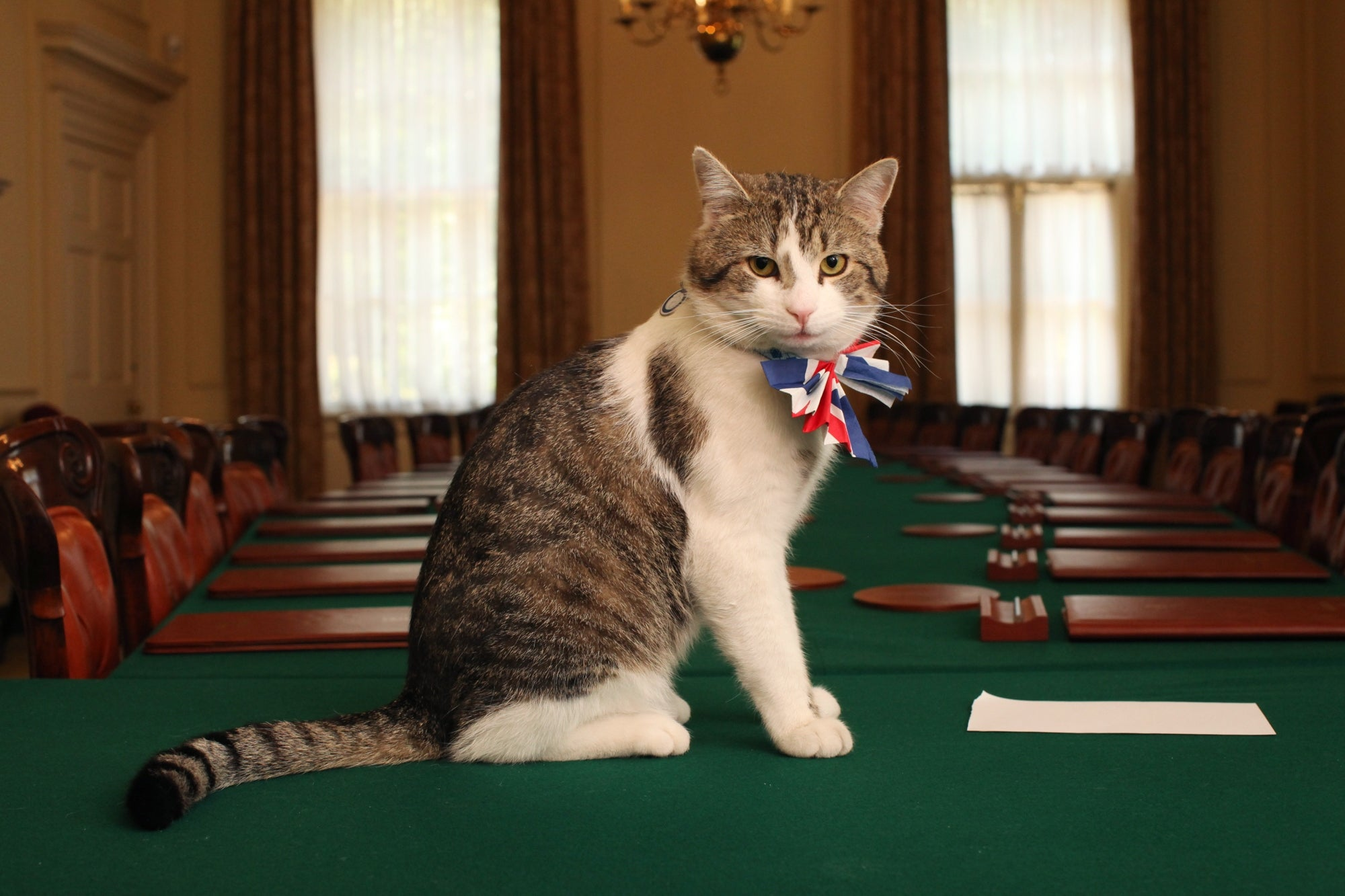
Larry, Chief Mouser to the Cabinet Office since 2011

Cats, as with the traditional farm cat and ship's cat, are also used for pest control, particularly in the case of rat or mouse infestation. As such, they are sometimes referred to as a mouser, and in the United Kingdom there has been one at Number 10 since the 1500s (officially titled 'Chief Mouser to the Cabinet Office' since 2011; additional duties include "greeting guests to the house, inspecting security defences, and testing antique furniture for napping quality").

== Domesticated varieties ==
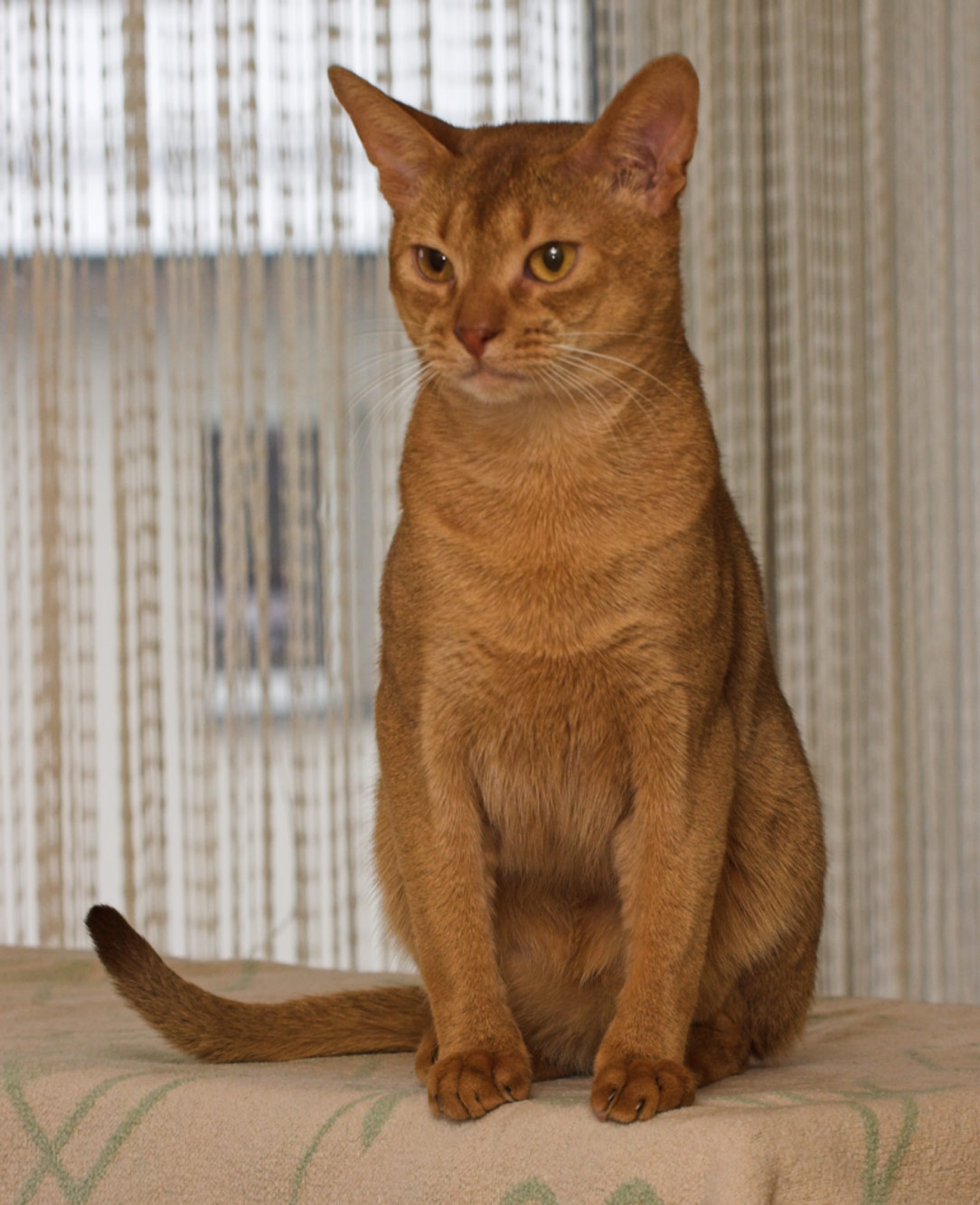
An Abyssinian cat

The current list of cat breeds is quite large, with the US Cat Fanciers' Association recognizing 41 breeds, of which 16 are "natural breeds" that probably emerged before humans began breeding pedigree cats, while the others were developed over the latter half of the 20th century. Because of common crossbreeding, many cats are simply identified as belonging to the homogeneous breeds of domestic longhair and domestic shorthair, depending on their type of fur.

== Effects on human health ==
Because of their small size, domesticated house cats pose little physical danger to adult humans. However, in the US cats inflict about 400,000 bites per year that result in emergency room visits, at least 10% of which are bites from cats that were unprovoked. This number represents about one in ten of all animal bites. Cat bites may become infected, sometimes with serious consequences such as cat-scratch disease, or, very rarely, rabies. Cats may also pose a danger to pregnant women and immunosuppressed individuals, since their feces, in rare cases, can transmit toxoplasmosis. A large percentage of cats are infected with this parasite, with infection rates ranging from around 40 to 60% in both domestic and stray cats worldwide. Research indicates a correlation between the parasite Toxoplasma gondii, which sexually reproduces exclusively in cats, and numerous human psychiatric conditions, including OCD.

Allergic reactions to cats are relatively common, happening in as many as every 3 in 10 Americans. The major allergen, Fel d 1, is found in the saliva and/or dander of all cat breeds. There have been attempts to breed hypoallergenic cats, which would be less likely to provoke an allergic reaction. Some humans who are allergic to cats—typically manifested by hay fever, asthma, or a skin rash—quickly acclimate themselves to a particular animal and live comfortably in the same house with it, while retaining an allergy to cats in general. Whether the risk of developing allergic diseases such as asthma is increased or decreased by cat ownership is uncertain. Some owners cope with this problem by taking allergy medicine, along with bathing their cats frequently, since weekly bathing will reduce the amount of dander shed by a cat.

As well as posing health risks, interactions with cats may improve health and reduce physical responses to stress: for example the presence of cats may moderately decrease blood pressure. Cat ownership may also improve psychological health by providing emotional support and dispelling feelings of depression, anxiety and loneliness. Their ability to provide companionship and friendship are common reasons given for owning a cat.

From another point of view, cats are thought to be able to improve the general mood of their owners by alleviating negative attitudes. According to a Swiss study carried out in 2003, cats may change the overall psychological state of their owner as their company's effect appears to be comparable to that of a human partner. The researchers concluded that, while cats were not shown to promote positive moods, they do alleviate negative ones.

One study found that cat ownership is associated with a reduced risk of heart attacks and strokes at the 95% confidence interval.

Several studies have shown that cats develop affection towards their owners. However, the effect of these pets on human health is closely related to the time and effort the cat owner is able to invest in it, in terms of bonding and playing.

Ailurophobia is a rare animal phobia affecting humans characterized by the persistent and excessive fear or hate of cats. The exact cause of ailurophobia is unknown and potential treatment usually involves therapy. The case of Stephen Bouquet is a classic example of ailurophobia.

=== Therapy cats ===
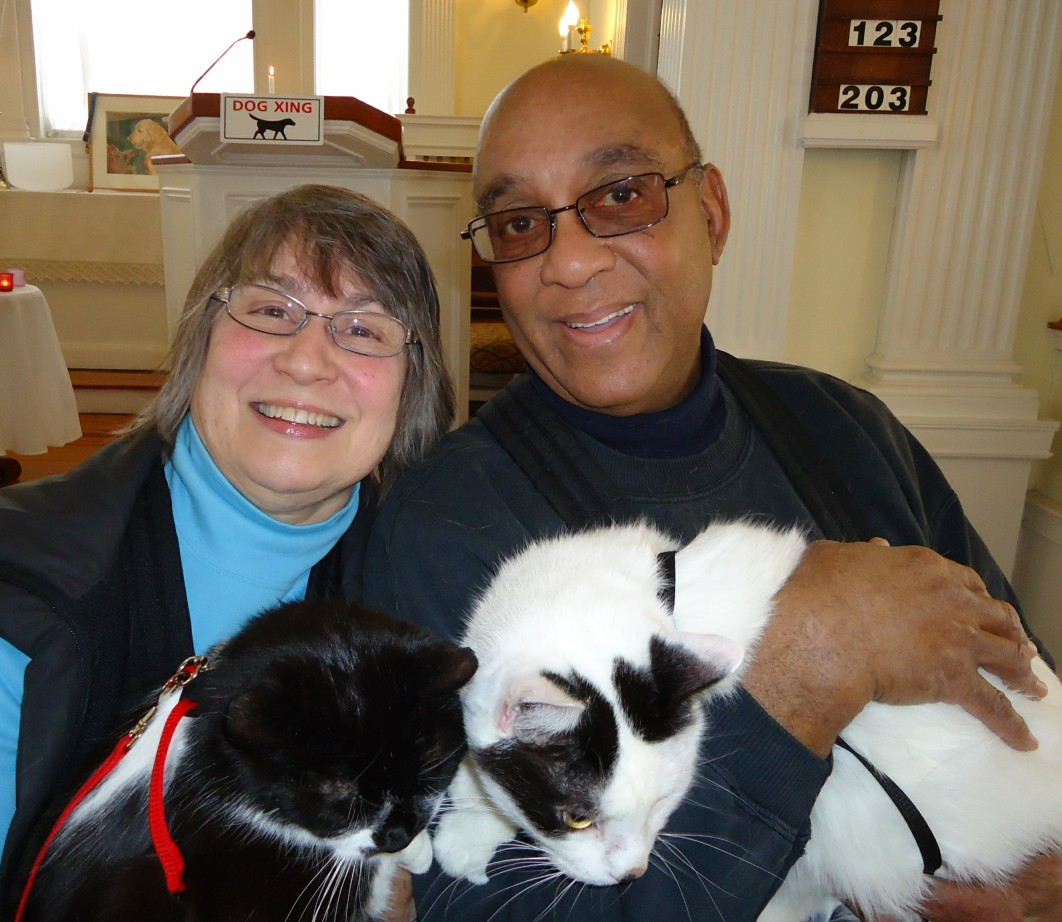
Therapy cats at work, New Jersey, US

Some cats, called therapy cats, are trained to help ailing humans in a medically beneficial way to take advantage of the human–animal interaction for purposes of relaxation and healing. Certain breeds are desirable when looking into therapy cats due to their personality and temperament. Some examples of preferred breeds are Ragdolls, Maine Coons, American Shorthairs, Siamese, and Persians. The important traits to look for in a cat include a steady demeanor with tolerance to sights and sounds that are unfamiliar or sudden, petting that could be awkward or rough, and the ability to stay calm when being poked or pulled in unusual manners. Therapy cats must also be acclimated to humans of all ages and enjoy engaging with strangers daily. Some therapy cats are used as alternatives to therapy dogs due to the cats' size and nature, allowing them to work with patients/people who might otherwise be scared of dogs. Therapy cats should still be accustomed to dogs since most visits happen in conjunction with one another.

The presence of cats in addition to their purring as well as petting them can deliver both psychological and physical benefits. Therapy cats are being used as companions to help the recovery and well-being of people who have had strokes, high blood pressure, anxiety, and/or depression to name a few.

Therapy cats are utilized as companions at juvenile detention centers; for children with developmental disabilities; and for children with language, speech and hearing difficulties. Therapy cats are also sometimes used in hospitals to relax children who are staying there, as well as helping those in hospice care cope with their terminal illness.

== Indoor scratching ==
A natural behavior in cats is to hook their front claws periodically into suitable surfaces and pull backwards. Cats, like humans, keep their muscles trim and their body flexible by stretching. Additionally, such periodic scratching serves to clean and sharpen their claws. Indoor cats may benefit from being provided with a scratching post so that they are less likely to use carpet or furniture, which they can easily ruin. However, some cats may simply ignore such a device. Commercial scratching posts typically are covered in carpeting or upholstery. Using a plain wooden surface, or reversing the carpeting on the posts so that the rougher texture of the carpet backing faces outward, may be a more attractive alternative to the cat than the floor covering. Scratching posts made of sisal rope or corrugated cardboard are also common.

Although scratching can serve cats to keep their claws from growing excessively long, their nails can be trimmed if necessary. Another response to indoor scratching is onychectomy, commonly known as declawing. This is a surgical procedure to remove the claw and first bone of each digit of a cat's paws. Declawing is most commonly only performed on the front feet. A related procedure is tendonectomy, which involves cutting a tendon needed for cats to extend their claws. Declawing is a major surgical procedure and can produce pain and infections.

Since this surgery is almost always performed for the benefit of owners, it is controversial and remains uncommon outside of North America. In many countries, declawing is prohibited by animal welfare laws and it is ethically controversial within the veterinary community. While both the Humane Society of the United States and the American Society for the Prevention of Cruelty to Animals strongly discourage or condemn the procedure, the American Veterinary Medical Association supports the procedure under certain guidelines and finds "no scientific evidence that declawing leads to behavioral abnormalities when the behavior of declawed cats is compared with that of cats in control groups." They further argue that many cats would be given up and euthanized were declawing not performed.

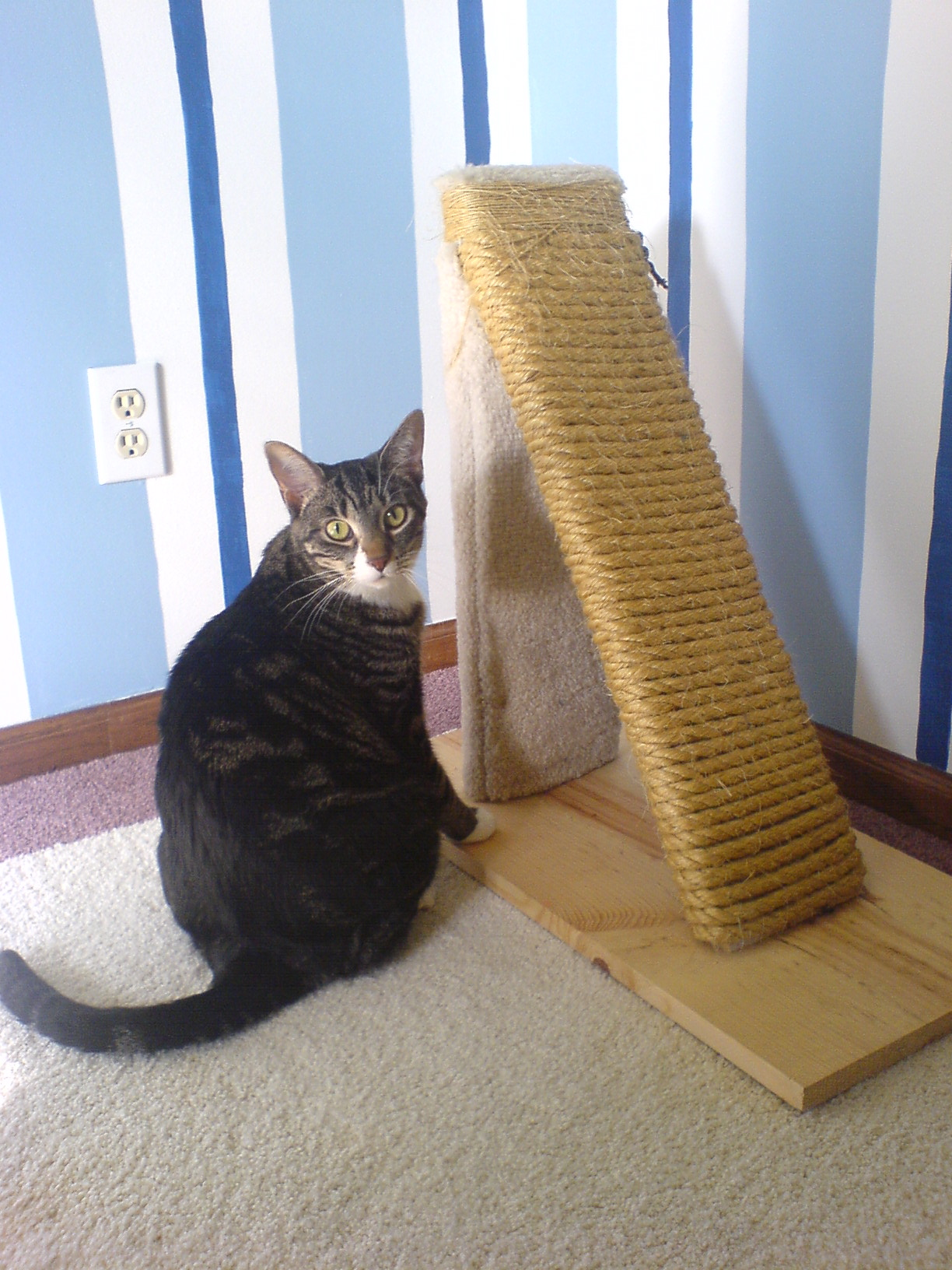
A domestic cat with a scratching post used for indoor claw maintenance.

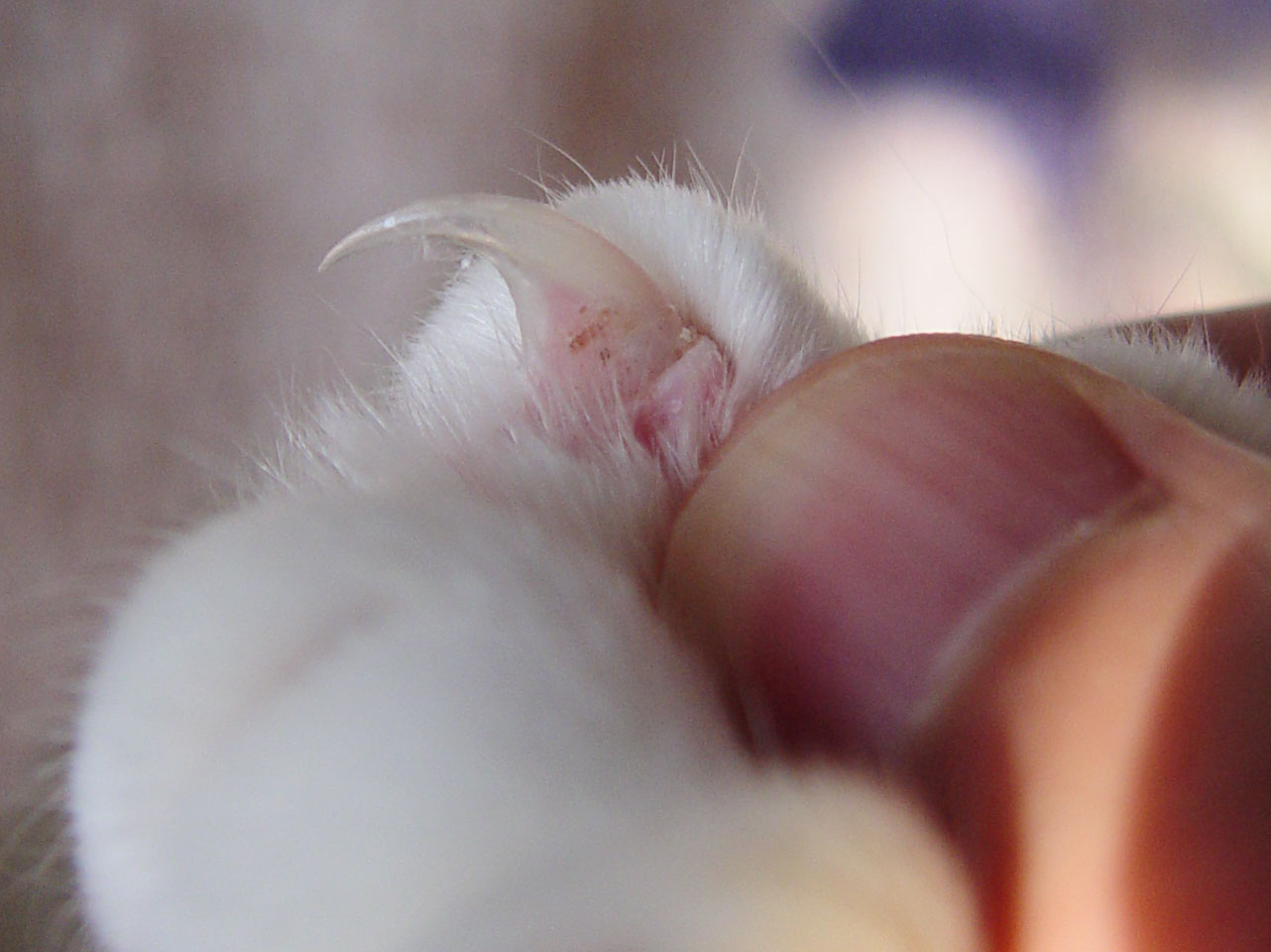
Close-up of a cat's claw

Cat getting his nails trimmed

== Waste ==
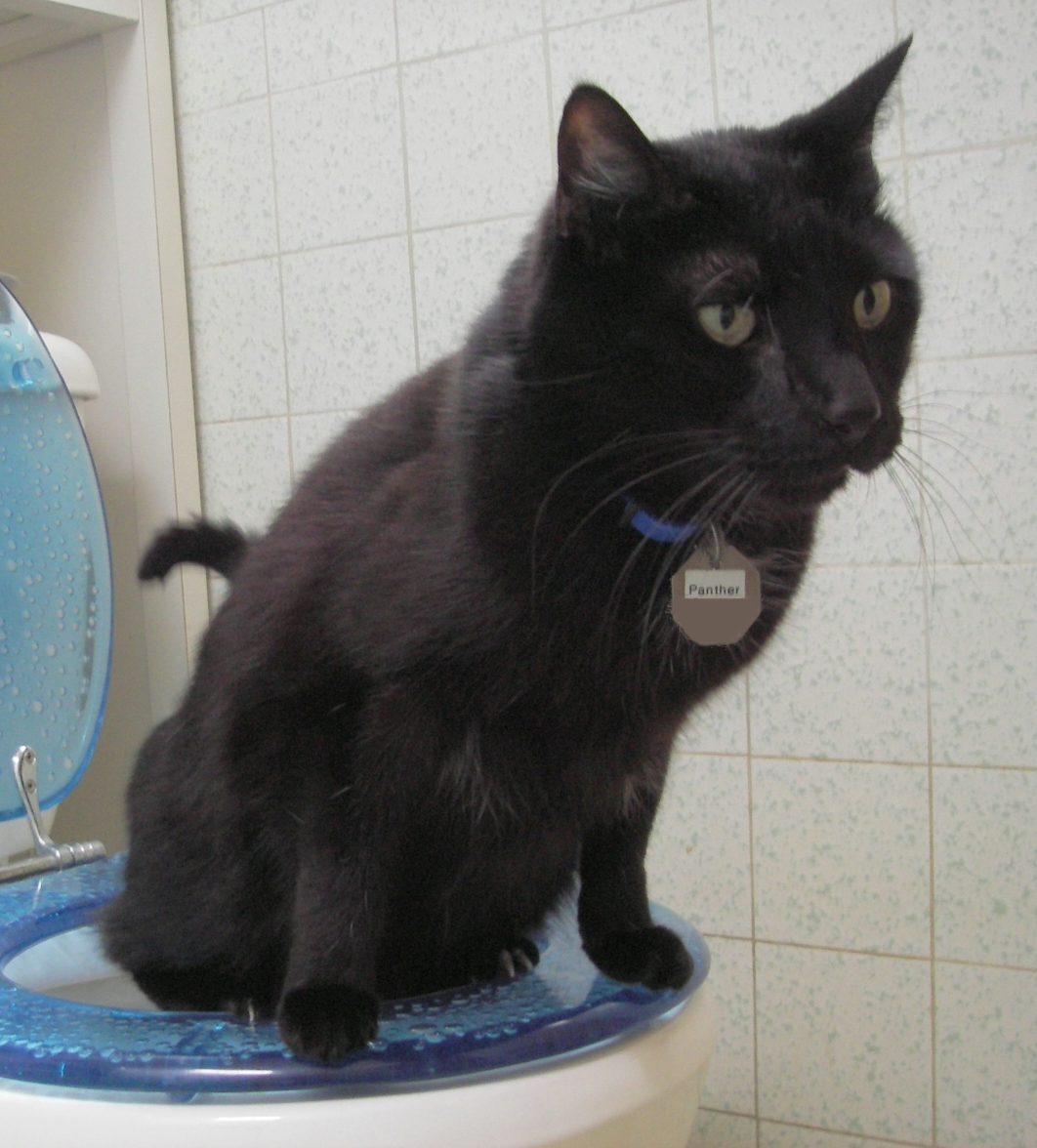
A toilet-trained house cat

Being fastidious self-cleaners, cats detest their own waste and instinctually bury their urine and feces. House cats are usually provided with a box containing litter, generally consisting of bentonite, but sometimes other absorbent material such as shredded paper or wood chips, or sometimes sand or similar material can be used. It should be cleaned daily and changed often, depending on the number of cats using it and the type of litter; if it is not kept clean, a cat may be fastidious enough to find other locations for urination or defecation. This may also happen for other reasons; for instance, if a cat becomes constipated and defecation is uncomfortable, it may associate the discomfort with the litter box and avoid it in favor of another location.

Daily attention to the litter box also serves as a monitor of the cat's health. Bentonite or clumping litter is a variation which absorbs urine into clumps which can be sifted out along with feces, and thus stays cleaner longer with regular sifting, but has sometimes been reported to cause health problems in some cats.

Some cats can be trained to use the human toilet, eliminating the litter box and its attendant expense, unpleasant odor, and the need to use landfill space for disposal.

An exhibit at the San Diego Natural History Museum states that cat feces from urban runoff carry Toxoplasma gondii parasites to the ocean and kill sea otters.

== Pet humanization ==
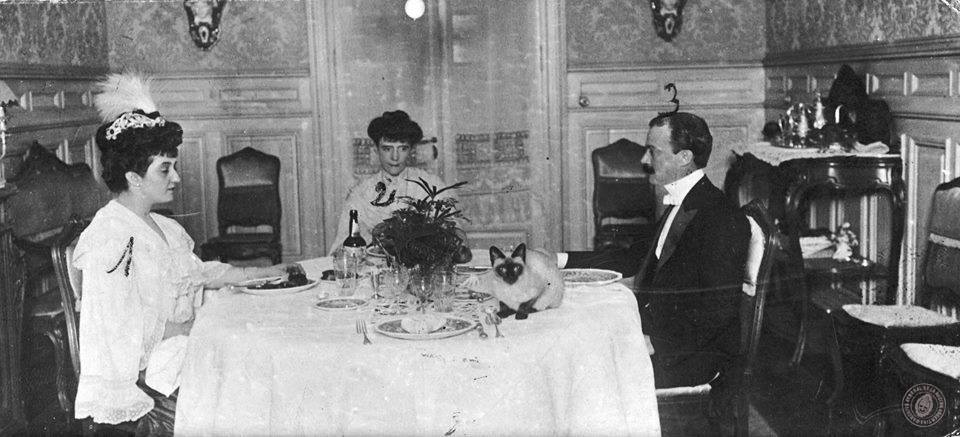
Julio Argentino Pascual Roca having lunch with his Siamese cat sitting on the table

Pet humanization is a form of anthropomorphism in which cats are kept for companionship and treated more like human family members than traditional pets. This trend of pet culture involves providing cats with a higher level of care, attention and often even luxury, similar to the way humans are treated. It involves attributing human-like qualities, emotions and needs to cats and providing them with care, attention and comforts similar to those given to human family members. In a pet-humanized context, cats kept as pets are often regarded as beloved members of the family, rather than just animals or possessions.

== Genetic similarities with humans ==
Cats and humans evolutionarily diverged from a common ancestor (boreoeutherian ancestor) approximately 80 million years ago, accumulating only 10–12 chromosomal translocations. The order of eight genes on the cats' Y chromosome closely resembles that in humans. Genes on X chromosomes of cats and humans are arranged in a similar way.

Domestic cats are affected by over 250 naturally occurring hereditary disorders, many of which are similar to those in humans, such as diabetes, hemophilia and Tay–Sachs disease. For example, Abyssinian cat's pedigree contains a genetic mutation that causes retinitis pigmentosa, which also affects humans. The domestic cat is also an excellent model for human infectious diseases, including HIV/AIDS. Feline immunodeficiency virus (FIV) is a genetic relative of HIV.

== See also ==
- Ailurophobia
- Bodega cat
- Cat bite
- Cat café
- Cat lady
- Cat lover culture
- Cat massage
- Cat meat
- Cat show
- Cats and Islam
- Cats by country
- Cats in ancient Egypt
- Farm cat
- Feral cat
- Library cat
- List of individual cats
- Lolcat
- National Cat Day
- Pet humanization
- Ship's cat
- Zoonosis
