= Odor =

Volatile chemical compounds perceived by the sense of smell

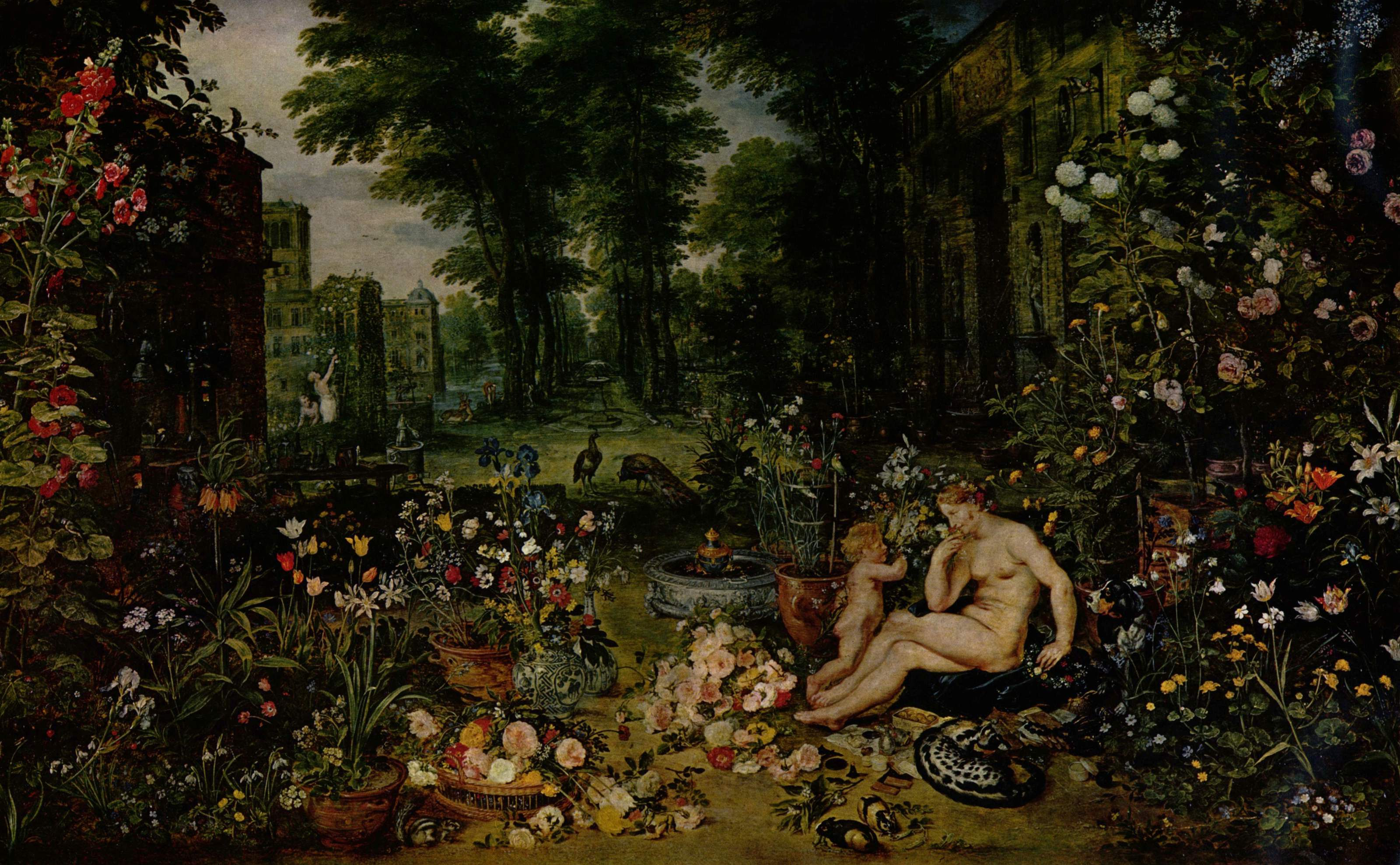
"Smell", from Allegory of the Senses by Jan Brueghel the Elder, Museo del Prado

An odor (American English) or odour (Commonwealth English; see spelling differences) is a smell or a scent caused by one or more volatilized chemical compounds generally found in low concentrations that humans and many animals can perceive via their olfactory system. While smell can refer to pleasant and unpleasant odors, the terms scent, aroma, and fragrance are usually reserved for pleasant-smelling odors and are frequently used in the food and cosmetic industry to describe floral scents or to refer to perfumes.

== Odor physiology ==
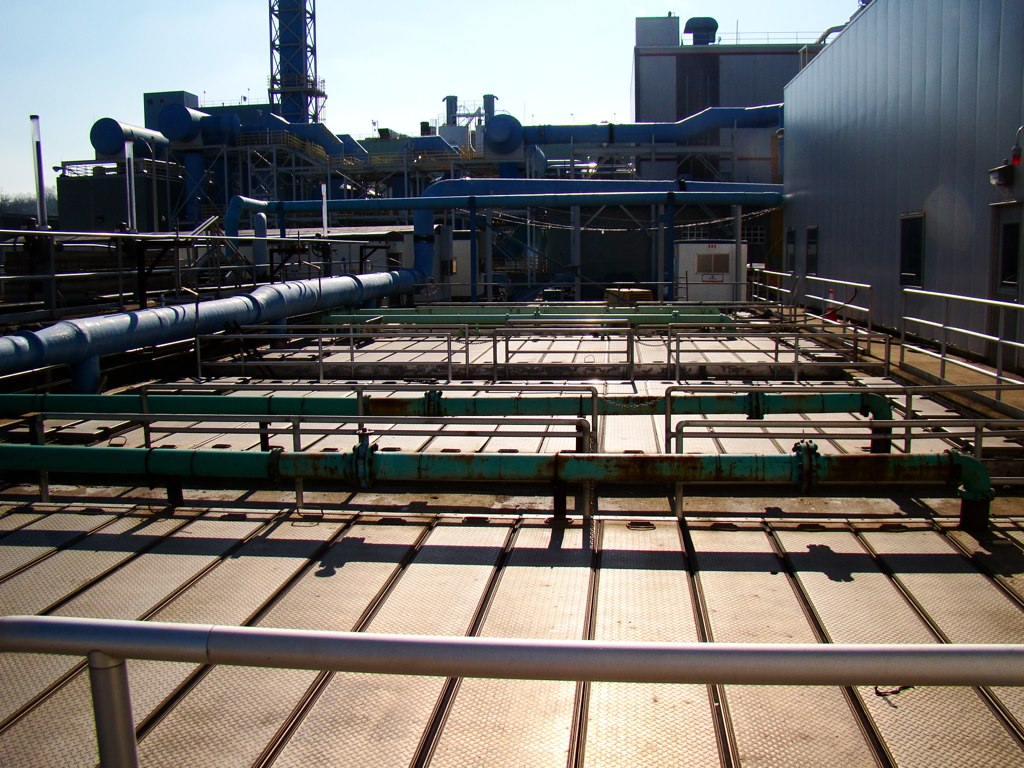
Odor control covers at a sewage treatment plant: Under these covers, grit and gravel are settled out of the wastewater.

=== Sense of smell ===
The perception of odors, or sense of smell, is mediated by the olfactory nerve. The olfactory receptor (OR) cells are neurons present in the olfactory epithelium, which is a small patch of tissue at the back of the nasal cavity. There are millions of olfactory receptor neurons that act as sensory signaling cells. Each neuron has cilia in direct contact with the air. Odorous molecules bind to receptor proteins extending from cilia and act as a chemical stimulus, initiating electric signals that travel along the olfactory nerve's axons to the brain.

When an electrical signal reaches a threshold, the neuron fires, which sends a signal traveling along the axon to the olfactory bulb, a part of the limbic system of the brain. Interpretation of the smell begins there, relating the smell to past experiences and in relation to the substance(s) inhaled. The olfactory bulb acts as a relay station connecting the nose to the olfactory cortex in the brain. Olfactory information is further processed and forwarded to the central nervous system (CNS), which controls emotions and behavior as well as basic thought processes.

Odor sensation usually depends on the concentration (number of molecules) available to the olfactory receptors. A single odorant is usually recognized by many receptors. Different odorants are recognized by combinations of receptors. The patterns of neuron signals help to identify the smell. The olfactory system does not interpret a single compound, but instead the whole odorous mix. This does not correspond to the concentration or intensity of any single constituent.

Most odors consist of organic compounds, although some simple compounds not containing carbon, such as hydrogen sulfide and ammonia, are also odorants. The perception of an odor effect is a two-step process. First, there is the physiological part. This is the detection of stimuli by receptors in the nose. The stimuli are recognized by the region of the human brain which handles olfaction. Because of this, an objective and analytical measure of odor is impossible. While odor feelings are personal perceptions, individual reactions are usually related. They relate to things such as gender, age, state of health, and personal history.

=== Smell acuity by age and gender ===
The ability to identify odor varies among people and decreases with age. Studies claim that there are sex differences in odor discrimination, and that women usually outperform men. Conversely, there are some studies claiming a male advantage. A 2019 meta-analysis claimed that the differences in olfaction are extremely small, but confirmed a small advantage for women.

Pregnant women have increased smell sensitivity, sometimes resulting in abnormal taste and smell perceptions, leading to food cravings or aversions. The ability to taste also decreases with age as the sense of smell tends to dominate the sense of taste. Chronic smell problems are reported in small numbers for those in their mid-twenties, with numbers increasing steadily, with overall sensitivity beginning to decline in the second decade of life, and then deteriorating appreciably as age increases, especially once over 70 years of age.

=== Smell acuity compared to other animals ===
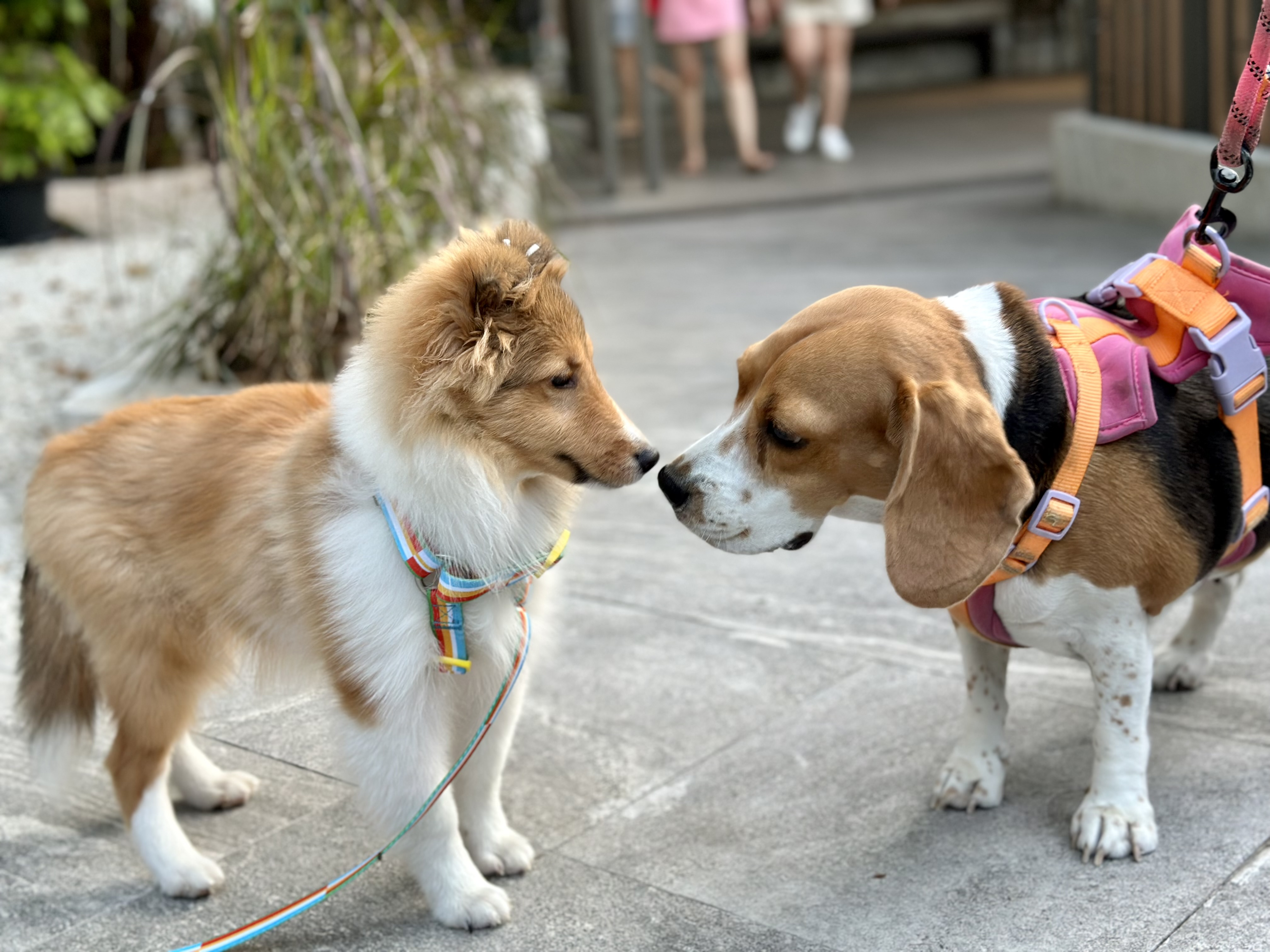
Two dogs sniffing each other

For most untrained individuals, the act of smelling acquires little information concerning the specific ingredients of an odor. Their smell perception primarily offers information that elicits an emotional response. Experienced individuals, however, such as flavorists and perfumers, can identify discrete chemicals in complex mixtures using only their sense of smell.

Odor perception is a primary evolutionary sense. The sense of smell can induce pleasure or subconsciously warn of danger, which may, for example, help to locate mates, find food, or detect predators. Humans have an unusually good sense of smell considering they have only 350 functional olfactory receptor genes compared to the 1,300 found in mice, for example. This is despite an apparent evolutionary decline in the sense of smell. The human sense of smell is comparable with many animals, able to distinguish between a diverse range of odors. Studies have reported that humans can distinguish in the region of one trillion unique aromas.

=== Habituation or adaptation ===
Odors that a person is used to, such as their own body odor, are less noticeable than uncommon odors. This is due to "habituation." After continuous odor exposure, the sense of smell is fatigued, but recovers if the stimulus is removed for a time. Odors can change due to environmental conditions: for example, odors tend to be more distinguishable in cool dry air.

Habituation affects the ability to distinguish odors after continuous exposure. The sensitivity and ability to discriminate odors diminishes with exposure, and the brain tends to ignore continuous stimulus and focus on differences and changes in a particular sensation. When odorants are mixed, a habitual odorant is blocked. This depends on the strength of the odorants in the mixture, which can change the perception and processing of an odor. This process helps classify similar odors as well as adjust sensitivity to differences in complex stimuli.

=== Genetic component ===
The primary gene sequences for thousands of olfactory receptors are known for the genomes of more than a dozen organisms. They are seven-helix-turn transmembrane proteins. But there are no known structures for any olfactory receptor. There is a conserved sequence in roughly three quarters of all ORs. This is a tripodal metal-ion binding site, and Suslick has proposed that the ORs are in fact metalloproteins (most likely with zinc, copper, and manganese ions) that serve as a Lewis Acid site for the binding of many odorant molecules. In 1978, Crabtree suggested that Cu(I) is "the most likely candidate for a metallo-receptor site in olfaction" of strong-smelling volatiles. These are also good metal-coordinating ligands, such as thiols. In 2012, Zhuang, Matsunami, and Block confirmed the Crabtree/Suslick proposal for the specific case of a mouse OR, MOR244-3, showing that copper is essential for detection of certain thiols and other sulfur-containing compounds. Thus, by using a chemical that binds to copper in the mouse nose, so that copper was not available to the receptors, the authors showed that the mice could not detect the thiols without the copper. However, these authors also found that MOR244-3 lacks the specific metal ion binding site suggested by Suslick, instead showing a different motif in the EC2 domain.

=== Evolutionary impact ===
Gordon Shepherd proposed that the retro-nasal route of olfaction (odorants introduced to the olfactory mucosa through the oral cavity often as food) was partially responsible for the development of human olfactory acuity. He suggested the evolutionary pressure of diversification of food sources and increased complexity of food preparation presented humans with a broader range of odorants, ultimately leading to a "richer repertoire of smells". Animals such as dogs show a greater sensitivity to odors than humans, especially in studies using short-chain compounds. Higher cognitive brain mechanisms and more olfactory brain regions enable humans to discriminate odors better than other mammals despite fewer olfactory receptor genes.

== Measuring techniques ==
=== Concentration ===
Odor concentration refers to an odor's pervasiveness. To measure odor sensation, an odor is diluted to a detection or recognition threshold. The detection threshold is the concentration of an odor in air when 50% of a population can distinguish between the odorous sample and an odor-free reference sample. The recognition odor threshold is usually a factor of two to five higher than the detection threshold.

The measurement of odor concentration is the most widespread method to quantify odors. It is standardized in CEN EN 13725:2003. The method is based on dilution of an odor sample to the odor threshold. The numerical value of the odor concentration is equal to the dilution factor that is necessary to reach the odor threshold. Its unit is the "European Odour Unit", OU_{E}. Therefore, the odor concentration at the odor threshold is 1 OU_{E} by definition.

=== Olfactometer ===
To establish odor concentration, an olfactometer is used which employs a group of human panelists. A diluted odorous mixture and an odor-free gas—n-butanol—as a reference are presented from sniffing ports to a group of panelists who are sensitive in odor perception. To collect an odor sample, the samples are collected using specialized sample bags, which are made from an odor free material, e.g., Teflon. The most accepted technique for collecting odor samples is the lung technique, where the sample bag is placed in a sealed drum, where a vacuum is created outside the bag, which fills under expansion, and draws into itself the sample from the source. Critically, all components which touch the odor sample, must be odor free, which includes lines and fittings.

In comparing the odor emitted from each port, the panelists are asked to report if they can detect a difference between the ports. The gas-diluting ratio is then decreased by a factor of 1.4 or two (i.e., the concentration is increased accordingly). The panelists are asked to repeat the test. This continues until the panelists respond with certainty and correctly twice in a row. These responses are used to calculate the concentration of the odor in terms of European odor units (OU_{E}/m^{3}, where 1 OU_{E}/m^{3}≡40 ppb/v n-butanol).

Humans can discriminate between two odorants that differ in concentration by as little as 7%. A human's odor detection threshold is variable. Repeated exposure to an odorant leads to enhanced olfactory sensitivity and decreased detection thresholds for a number of different odorants. It was found in a study that humans who were unable to detect the odor of androstenone developed the ability to detect it after repeated exposure. People who cannot smell are said to be anosmic.

There are a number of issues which have to be overcome with sampling, these include:

1. If the source is under vacuum
2. if the source is at a high temperature
3. If the source has high humidity

Issues such as temperature and humidity are best overcome using either pre-dilution or dynamic dilution techniques.

=== Other analytical methods ===
Other analytic methods can be subdivided into the physical, the gas chromatographical, and the chemosensory method.

When measuring odor, there is a difference between emission and immission measurements. Emission measurement can be taken by olfactometry using an olfactometer to dilute the odor sample. Olfactometry is rarely used for immission measurement because of low odor concentrations involved. The same measuring principles are used, but the judgment of the air-assay happens without diluting the samples.

Odor measurement is essential for odor regulation and control. An odor emission often consists of a complex mixture of many odorous compounds. Analytical monitoring of individual chemical compounds present in such an odor is usually not practical. As a result, odor sensory methods, instead of instrumental methods, are normally used to measure such odor. Odor sensory methods are available to monitor odor both from source emissions and in the ambient air. These two contexts require different approaches for measuring odor. The collection of odor samples is more easily accomplished for a source emission than for odor in the ambient air.

Field measurement with portable field olfactometers can seem more effective, but olfactometer use is not regulated in Europe, while it is popular in the U.S. and Canada, where several states set limits at the receptor sites or along the perimeter of odor-emitting plants, expressed in units of dilution-to-threshold (D/T).

=== Intensity ===
Odor intensity refers to the perceived strength of an odor sensation. This intensity property is used to locate the source of odors and perhaps most directly related to odor nuisance.

The perceived strength of an odor is measured alongside its concentration and can be mathematically modeled using the Weber-Fechner law: I = a × log(c) + b, where:

- I represents the perceived psychological intensity at a given dilution step on the butanol scale,
- a is the Weber-Fechner coefficient,
- C is the chemical concentration, and
- b is the intercept constant (0.5 by definition).

Odor intensity can be expressed using an odor intensity scale, which is a verbal description of an odor sensation to which a numerical value is assigned.

Odor intensity can be divided into the following categories according to intensity:

0 – no odor
1 – very weak (odor threshold)
2 – weak
3 – distinct
4 – strong
5 – very strong
6 – intolerable

Odor intensity is determined in a laboratory by specialists who have been trained to accurately define intensity.

=== Hedonic tone assessment ===
Hedonic assessment is the process of rating odors according to a scale ranging from extremely unpleasant to extremely pleasant. Intensity and hedonic tone, whilst similar, refer to different things: that is, the strength of the odor (intensity) and the pleasantness of an odor (hedonic tone). The perception of an odor may change from pleasant to unpleasant with increasing concentration, intensity, time, frequency, or previous experience with a specific odor—all factors in determining a response.

=== FIDOL factors ===
The overall set of qualities are sometimes identified as the "FIDOL (Frequency, Intensity, Duration, Offensiveness, Location) factors".

The character of an odor is a critical element in assessing an odor. This property is the ability to distinguish different odors and is only descriptive. First, a basic description is used—such as sweet, pungent, acrid, fragrant, warm, dry, or sour. The odor is then referenced to a source such as sewage or apple which can then be followed by a reference to a specific chemical such as acids or gasoline.

Most commonly, a set of standard descriptors is used, which may range from "fragrant" to "sewer odor". Although the method is fairly simplistic, it is important for the FIDOL factors to be understood by the person rating the smell. This method is most commonly used to define the character of an odor which can then be compared to other odors. It is common for olfactometry laboratories to report character as an additional factor post sample-analysis.

==== Categorization ====
Different categorizations of primary odors have been proposed, including the following, which identifies 7 primary odors:

1. Musky – perfumes
2. Putrid – rotten eggs
3. Pungent – vinegar
4. Camphoraceous – mothballs
5. Ethereal – dry cleaning fluid
6. Floral – roses (see also floral scent)
7. Pepperminty – mint gum

However, the concept of primary odors is not universally accepted.

=== Interpretive dispersion modeling ===
In many countries odor modeling is used to determine the extent of an impact from an odor source. These are a function of modeled concentration, averaging time (over what time period the model steps are run over, typically hourly), and a percentile. Percentiles refer to a statistical representation of how many hours per year the concentration C may be exceeded based on the averaging period.

=== Sampling from area sources ===
There are two main odor sampling techniques: direct and indirect odor sampling techniques.

==== Direct sampling ====
Direct refers to the placement of an enclosure on or over an emitting surface from which samples are collected, and an odor emission rate is determined.

The most commonly used direct methods include the flux chamber and wind tunnels such as the one at the University of New South Wales (UNSW). There are many other available techniques, and consideration should be given to a number of factors before selecting a suitable method.

A source which has implications for this method are sources, such as bark bed biofilters, that have a vertical velocity component. For such sources, consideration must be given as to the most appropriate method. A commonly used technique is to measure the odor concentration at the emitting surface, and combine this with the volumetric flow rate of air entering the biofilter to produce an emission rate.

==== Indirect sampling ====
Indirect sampling is often referred to as back calculation. It involves the use of a mathematical formula to predict an emission rate.

Many methods are used, but all make use of the same inputs which include surface roughness, upwind and downwind concentrations, stability class (or other similar factor), wind speed, and wind direction.

== Health risks ==
The human sense of smell is a primary factor in the sensation of comfort. Olfaction as a sensory system brings awareness of the presence of airborne chemicals. Some inhaled chemicals are volatile compounds that act as a stimulus, triggering unwanted reactions such as nose, eye, and throat irritation. Perception of odor and of irritation is unique to each person, and varies because of physical conditions or memory of past exposures to similar chemicals. A person's specific threshold, before an odor becomes a nuisance, depends also on the frequency, concentration, and duration of an odor.

The perception of irritation from odor sensation is hard to investigate because exposure to a volatile chemical elicits a different response based on sensory and physiological signals, and interpretation of these signals is influenced by experience, expectations, personality, or situational factors. Volatile organic compounds (VOCs) may have higher concentrations in confined indoor environments, due to restricted infiltration of fresh air, as compared to the outdoor environment, leading to greater potential for toxic health exposures from a variety of chemical compounds. Health effects of odor are traced to the sensation of an odor or the odorant itself. Health effects and symptoms vary—including eye, nose, or throat irritation, cough, chest tightness, drowsiness, and mood change—all of which decrease as an odor ceases. Odors may also trigger illnesses such as asthma, depression, stress-induced illness, or hypersensitivity. The ability to perform tasks may decrease, and other social/behavioral changes may occur.

Occupants should expect remediation from disturbing and unexpected odors that disturb concentration, diminish productivity, evoke symptoms, and generally increase the dislike for a particular environment. It is important to set occupational exposure limits (OELs) to ensure the health and safety of workers, as well as comfort, because exposure to chemicals can elicit physiological and biochemical changes in the upper respiratory system. Standards are hard to set when exposures are not reported and can also be hard to measure. Workforce populations vary in terms of discomfort from odors because of exposure history or habituation, and they may not realize possible risks of exposure to chemicals that produce specific odors.

== Types ==
Some odors are sought after, such as from perfumes and flowers, some of which command high prices. Whole industries have developed around products that remove or mask unpleasant odors, such as deodorant.

Odor molecules transmit messages to the limbic system, the area of the brain that governs emotional responses. Some believe that these messages have the power to alter moods, evoke distant memories, raise spirits, and boost self-confidence. This belief has led to "aromatherapy", wherein fragrances are claimed to cure a wide range of psychological and physical problems. Aromatherapy claims that fragrances can positively affect sleep, stress, alertness, social interaction, and general feelings of well-being. Evidence for the effectiveness of aromatherapy is mostly anecdotal and controlled scientific studies to substantiate its claims are lacking.

Some people are allergic to the fragrances found in perfume, scented shampoo, scented deodorant, or similar products. Reactions, as with other chemical allergies, can range from slight headaches to anaphylactic shock, which can result in death.

Unpleasant odors play various roles in nature, often to warn of danger, though this may not be known to the subject who smells it. The natural gas industry uses odor to enable consumers to identify leaks. Natural gas in its native state is colorless and almost odorless. To help users detect leaks, an odorizer with the scent of rotten eggs, tert-Butylthiol (t-butyl mercaptan), is added. Sometimes a related compound, thiophane, may be used in the mixture.

An odor that is viewed as unpleasant by some people or cultures can be viewed as attractive by others where it is more familiar or has a better reputation. It is commonly thought that those exuding an unpleasant body odor are unattractive to others. But studies have shown that a person who is exposed to a particular unpleasant odor can be attracted to others who have been exposed to the same unpleasant odor. This includes odors associated with pollution.

What causes a substance to smell unpleasant may be different from what one perceives. For example, perspiration is often viewed as having an unpleasant odor, but it is odorless. It is bacteria in the perspiration that causes the odor.

Unpleasant odors can arise from specific industrial processes, adversely affecting workers and even residents downwind of the source. The most common sources of industrial odor arise from sewage treatment plants, refineries, animal rendering factories, and industries processing chemicals (such as sulfur) which have odorous characteristics. Sometimes industrial odor sources are the subject of community controversy and scientific analysis.

Body odor is present both in animals and humans and its intensity can be influenced by many factors (behavioral patterns, survival strategies). Body odor has a strong genetic basis both in animals and humans, but it can be also strongly influenced by various diseases and psychological conditions.

=== Study ===
The study of odors is a growing field but is a complex and difficult one. The human olfactory system can detect many thousands of scents based on only minute airborne concentrations of a chemical. The sense of smell of many animals is far superior. Some fragrant flowers give off odor plumes that move downwind and are detectable by bees more than a kilometer away.

The study of odors is complicated by the complex chemistry taking place at the moment of a smell sensation. For example, iron-containing metallic objects are perceived to have a distinctive odor when touched, although iron's vapor pressure is negligible. According to a 2006 study, this smell is the result of aldehydes (for example, nonanal) and ketones: oct-1-en-3-one) released from the human skin on contact with ferrous ions that are formed in the sweat-mediated corrosion of iron. The same chemicals are also associated with the smell of blood, as ferrous iron in blood on skin produces the same reaction.

=== Pheromones ===
Pheromones are odors that are used for communication, and are sometimes called "airborne hormones". A female moth may release a pheromone that can entice a male moth that is several kilometers downwind. Honeybee queens constantly release pheromones that regulate the activity of the hive. Worker bees can release such smells to call other bees into an appropriate cavity when a swarm moves into new quarters, or to "sound" an alarm when the hive is threatened.

=== Advanced technology ===
Most artificial or electronic nose instruments work by combining output from an array of non-specific chemical sensors to produce a fingerprint of whatever volatile chemicals in the local environment. Most electronic noses need to be "trained" to recognize chemicals of interest before it can be used. Many current electronic-nose instruments suffer from problems with reproducibility subject to varying ambient temperature and humidity. An example of this type of technology is the colorimetric sensor array, which visualizes odor through color change and creates a "picture" of it.

== Behavioral cues ==
Odor perception is a complex process involving the central nervous system and can evoke psychological and physiological responses. Because the olfactory signal terminates in or near the amygdala, odors are strongly linked to memories and can evoke emotions. The amygdala participates in the hedonic or emotional processing of olfactory stimuli. Odors can disturb our concentration, diminish productivity, evoke symptoms, and in general increase a dislike for an environment. Odors can impact the liking for a person, place, food, or product as a form of conditioning. Memories recalled by odors are significantly more emotional and evocative than those recalled by the same cue presented visually or auditorily. Odors can become conditioned to experiential states and when later encountered have directional influences on behavior. Doing a frustrating task in a scented room decreases performance of other cognitive tasks in the presence of the same odor. Nonhuman animals communicate their emotional states through changes in body odor, and human body odors are indicative of emotional state.

Human body odors influence interpersonal relationships and are involved in adaptive behaviors, such as parental attachment in infants or partner choice in adults. "Mothers can discriminate the odor of their own child, and infants recognize and prefer the body odor of their mother over that of another woman. This maternal odor appears to guide infants toward the breast and to have a calming effect." Body odor is involved in the development of infant–mother attachment and is essential to a child's social and emotional development and evokes feelings of security. Reassurance created by familiar parental body odors may contribute significantly to the attachment process. Human body odors can also affect mate choice. Fragrances are commonly used to raise sexual attractiveness and induce sexual arousal. Researchers found that people choose perfume that interacts well with their body odor.

Body odor is a sensory cue critical for mate selection in humans because it is a signal of immunological health. Women prefer men with major histocompatibility complex (MHC) genotypes and odor different from themselves especially during ovulation. Different MHC alleles are favorable because different allele combinations would maximize disease protection and minimize recessive mutations in offspring. Biologically females tend to select mates "who are most likely to secure offspring survival and thus increase the likelihood that her genetic contribution will be reproductively viable."

Studies have suggested that people might be using odor cues associated with the immune system to select mates. Using a brain-imaging technique, Swedish researchers have shown that gay and straight males' brains respond in different ways to two odors that may be involved in sexual arousal, and that the gay men respond in the same way as straight women, though it could not be determined whether this was cause or effect. The study was expanded to include lesbian women; the results were consistent with previous findings that lesbian women were not as responsive to male-identified odors, while their response to female cues was similar to that of straight males. According to the researchers, this research suggests a possible role for human pheromones in the biological basis of sexual orientation.

An odor can cue recall of a distant memory. Most memories that pertain to odor come from the first decade of life, compared to verbal and visual memories which usually come from the 10th to 30th years of life. Odor-evoked memories are more emotional, associated with stronger feelings of being brought back in time, and have been thought of less often as compared to memories evoked by other cues.

=== Use in design ===
The sense of smell is not overlooked as a way of marketing products. The deliberate and controlled application of scent is used by designers, scientists, artists, perfumers, architects, and chefs. Some applications of scents in environments are in casinos, hotels, private clubs, and new automobiles. For example, "technicians at New York City's Sloan-Kettering Cancer Center disperse vanilla-scented oil into the air to help patients cope with the claustrophobic effects of MRI testing. Scents are used at the Chicago Board of Trade to lower the decibel level on the trading floor."

If ingredients are listed on a product, the term "fragrance" can be used in a general sense.

== Scent preferences ==
=== Effect of perfume on sexual attractiveness ===
Both men and women use perfume to boost their sexual attractiveness to members of the opposite, or same, sex. When people find that a particular perfume or aftershave is perceived positively, they may be hard-pressed to change it. Olfactory communication is natural in humans. Without perfume or aftershave, humans unconsciously detect people's natural scents: in the form of pheromones. Pheromones are usually detected unconsciously, and it is believed that they have an important influence on human's social and sexual behavior. There are a number of hypotheses concerning why humans wear perfume or aftershave, and whether it amplifies or reduces their natural scents.

In 2001, a study found that the major histocompatibility complex (MHC) (a polymorphic set of genes which is important for immune-function in humans) is correlated with the ingredients found in perfume. This suggests that humans do, in fact, choose perfumes that complement or enhance their natural scents (their pheromones). This evidence offers support for the hypothesis that perfume is chosen by individuals to advertise their physical health. Research suggests that this advertisement of good health will, in fact, enhance females' attractiveness to the opposite sex as health markers have been shown to do. While strong evidence has been found to support the hypothesis that wearing perfume enhances females' attractiveness to males, little research has been done into the effect of fragrance on males' attractiveness to females. Considerably more research has covered the effect of males' natural odor and females' ratings of attractiveness. Many studies found that odor predicted attractiveness when female raters were not on any form of contraceptive pill. For those who were, there was no relation between attractiveness and body odor.

A person's odor can increase or decrease ratings of attractiveness because the olfactory receptors in the brain are directly linked with the limbic system, the part of the brain that is thought to be most involved with emotion. This link is important, because if an individual associates positive affect (elicited by pheromones), with a potential mate, their liking for, and attraction to, that potential mate will be increased. Although not a typically evolutionary hypothesis, this hypothesis is one that acknowledges how humans have adapted their mating strategies to modern-day societal norms.

=== Major histocompatibility complex (MHC) and body odor preferences ===
Major histocompatibility complex (MHC) is a genotype found in vertebrates, including humans. MHC is thought to contribute to mate choice in animals and humans. In sexual selection, females opt for mates with an MHC which differs from their own, optimizing genes for their offspring. The "heterozygote advantage" and "Red Queen" explanations for these findings fall under the "pathogen hypothesis". Due to differences in MHC alleles' resistance to pathogens, a preference for mates with a dissimilar MHC composition has been argued to act as a mechanism to avoid infectious diseases. According to the heterozygotes-advantage hypothesis, diversity within the MHC genotype is beneficial for the immune system due to a greater range of antigens available to the host. Therefore, the hypothesis proposes that MHC heterozygotes will be superior to MHC homozygotes in fighting off pathogens. Experimental research has shown mixed findings for this idea. The "Red Queen" or "rare-allele" hypothesis suggests that diversity in the MHC gene provides a moving target for pathogens, making it more difficult for them to adapt to MHC genotypes in the host. Another hypothesis suggests that preferences for MHC-dissimilar mates could serve to avoid inbreeding.

Body odor can provide MHC information. Although less is known about how odor is influenced by MHC genes, possible explanations have been that microbial flora or volatile acids are affected by the gene, which can be detected in body odor. Female mice and humans have both shown odor preferences for males with MHC-dissimilarity. Research has shown that women prefer the scent of men with dissimilar MHC genes. In a study, women rated the scent of T-shirts, worn over two nights by men, as more pleasant when smelling those of MHC-dissimilar men. It has also been found that women were reminded more of current or prior partners when smelling odors from men whose MHC was dissimilar to their own. A study of married couples found that MHC haplotypes differed between spouses more than chance would dictate. Taking oral contraceptives has been found to reverse the MHC-dissimilarity odor preference.

=== Women's scent preferences and the menstrual cycle ===
Women's preferences for body odor change with their menstrual cycles. The ovulatory-shift hypothesis argues that women experience elevated immediate sexual attraction, relative to low-fertile days of the cycle, to men with characteristics that reflect good genetic quality. As certain body odors can reflect good genetic quality, woman are more likely to prefer these scents when they are fertile, as this is when they are most likely to produce offspring with any potential mates, with conception-risk being related to a preference for the scent of male symmetry. Men also prefer the scent of women at their fertile cycle points.

There are several scents that reflect good genetic quality that females prefer during the most fertile phase of their cycles. Women prefer the scent of symmetrical men more during the fertile phases of their menstrual cycle than during their infertile phases, with estrogen positively predicting women's preferences for the scent of symmetry. Women's preferences for masculine faces is greatest when their fertility is at its highest, and so is the preference for attractive faces. Other scents found to be preferred by women in the most fertile phase of their cycle are the scent for developmental stability.

If women are taking a contraceptive pill the changes in mate scent preferences over the menstrual cycle are not expressed. If odor plays a role in human mate choice then the contraceptive pill could disrupt disassortative mate preferences. Those taking a contraceptive pill show no significant preference for the scent of either symmetrical or asymmetrical men, whereas normally cycling women prefer the scent of shirts worn by symmetrical men. Males' preferences for women's scent may also change if the woman is taking oral contraceptives. When women take a contraceptive pill, this has been found to demolish the cycle attractiveness of odors that men find attractive in normally ovulating women. Therefore, a contraceptive pill affects both women's preferences for scent and also affects their own scents, making their scent less attractive to males than the scent of normally cycling women.

== See also ==
- Fragrance compound – Chemical compound that has a smell or odor
- Chemoreceptor – Sensory receptor that detects chemicals
- Flavor – Sense of chemicals on the tongue
- Geosmin – Chemical compound responsible for the characteristic odour of earth
- Machine olfaction – Simulation of the sense of smell
- Olfaction – Sense that detects smells
- Olfactometer – Instrument used to detect and measure odor dilution
- Olfactory fatigue – Inability to distinguish an odor after prolonged exposure
- Perfume – Mixture of fragrant substance
- Petrichor – Earthy smell when rain falls on dry soil
- Phantosmia – Smelling of an odor not actually there
- Scented water – Lightly scented perfume
