= Dog sense of smell =

Olfactory sensory system

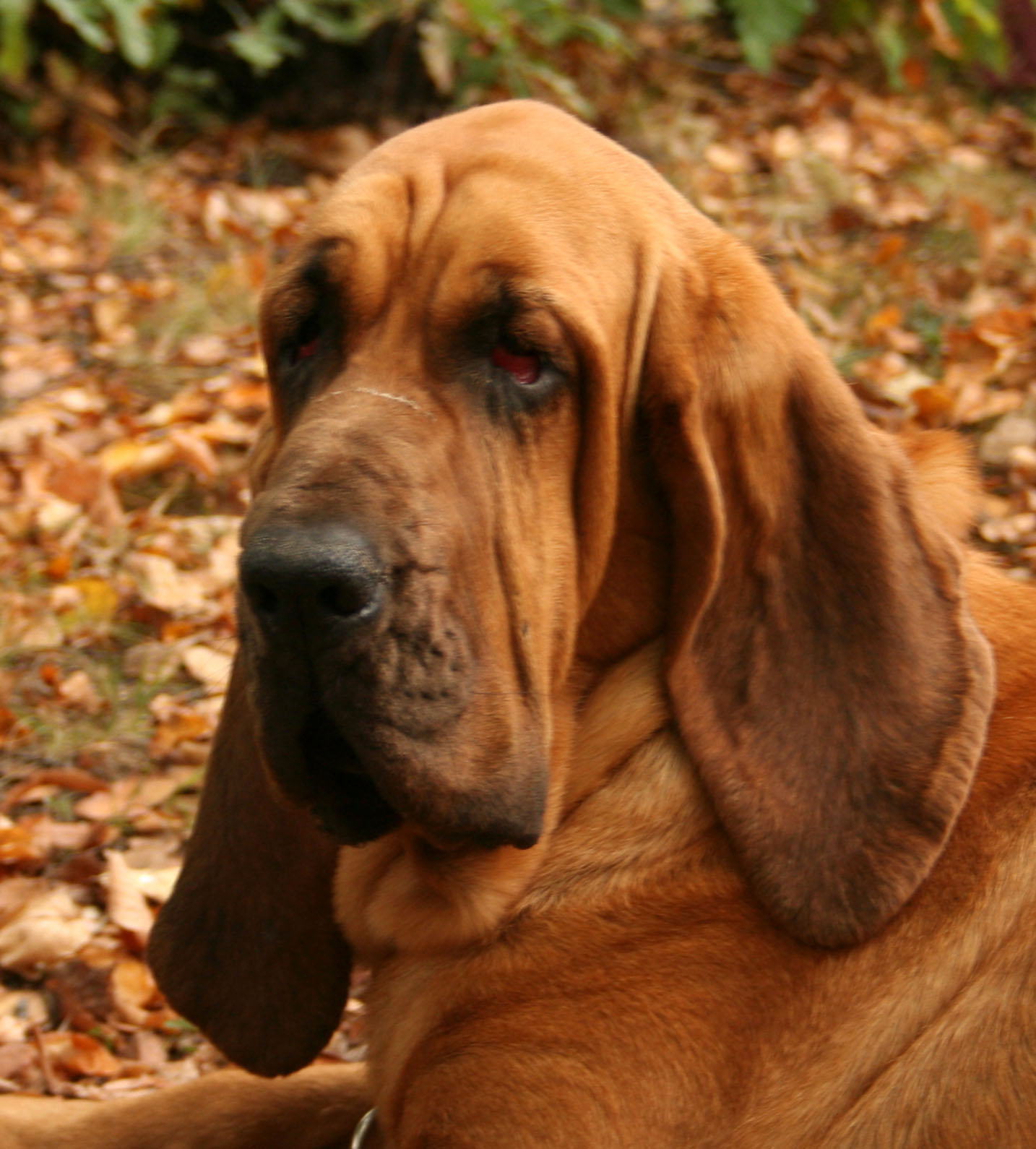
Scent hounds, especially the bloodhound, are bred for their keen sense of smell.

The dog sense of smell is the most powerful sense of this species, the olfactory system of canines being much more complex and developed than that of humans. It is believed to be up to 10 million times as sensitive as a human's in specialized breeds. Dogs have roughly forty times more smell-sensitive receptors than humans, ranging from about 125 million to nearly 300 million in some dog breeds, such as bloodhounds. These receptors are spread over an area about the size of a pocket handkerchief (compared to 5 million over an area the size of a postage stamp for humans). Dogs' sense of smell also includes the use of the vomeronasal organ, which is used primarily for social interactions.

The dog has mobile nostrils that help it determine the direction of the scent. Unlike humans, dogs do not need to fill up their lungs as they continuously bring odors into their noses in bursts of 3–7 sniffs. Dog noses have a bony structure inside that humans do not have, which allows the air that has been sniffed to pass over a bony shelf to which odor molecules adhere. The air above this shelf is not washed out when the dog breathes normally, so the scent molecules accumulate in the nasal chambers and the scent builds with intensity, allowing the dog to detect the faintest of odors and can even detect emotions.

One study into the learning ability of dogs compared to wolves indicated that dogs have a better sense of smell than wolves when locating hidden food, but there has yet been no experimental data to support this view.

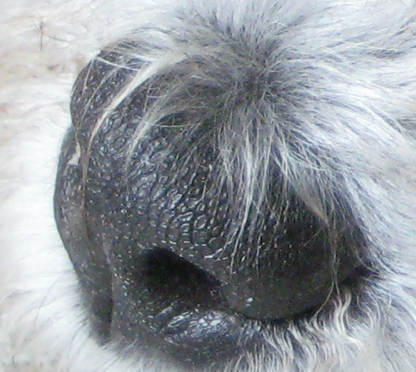
A typical dog's nose

The wet nose, or rhinarium, is essential for determining the direction of the air current containing the smell. Cold receptors in the skin are sensitive to the cooling of the skin by evaporation of the moisture by air currents.

== Function and mechanism ==
A great part of a dog's brain is dedicated to acquiring and interpreting odors, using its nose as a guide in sniffing in order to follow a trail. The animal performs a series of short inhalations and expirations, permitting it to bring the odor-bearing molecules in contact with its olfactory mucosa. These molecules are dissolved and then absorbed by cells of the olfactory epithelium before they reach neurons, which transmit information to the brain. Dogs with elongated noses perform better than dogs with a flat noses. Additionally, larger dogs have a better sense of smell than smaller dogs.

A dog's nose is significantly colder than its body temperature. This makes it more sensitive to thermal radiation. Dogs can thus detect even weak levels of warmth.

Dogs are able to smell from birth and this sense develops during the first two weeks of their life. Dogs can also learn scents in the womb. Soon after birth, dogs use their sense of smell to recognize their mothers. A dog is also able to identify foods which its mother has ingested, having learned their smells before birth.

When dogs sniff, they start by using only their right nostril. If they are comfortable with the smell, they then begin using their left nostril. This supports the theory that dogs process novel information using the right hemisphere of their brain, and the left for reacting to familiar situations. As dogs sniff, air travels along an upper and lower pathway. The lower pathway, where the majority of the air travels, leads to the lungs, while the upper pathway leads to olfactory receptors which detect scents. The lower pathway is also used for exhalation, allowing odor molecules to accumulate on the receptors.

=== Use in communication ===
Scent is used extensively in canine communication. Dogs may sniff each other directly, or may communicate through chemical signals. In direct contact, male dogs focus more on the rear ends of the dog which they are sniffing, while females tend to sniff the head. When communicating through chemical signals, the most common form of communication is urine-marking. Dogs can detect different qualities in another dog's urine, which may communicate information such as social status or sex.

== Comparison to humans ==
Dogs have vastly more powerful noses than humans. The typical dog's nose is 100,000 to 1 million times as sensitive as a human's, and the most sensitive breed, the bloodhound, has a sense of smell which can be up to 100 million times as sensitive. Additionally, dogs have much larger olfactory mucosa and a larger part of the brain dedicated to odors. Whereas in humans, 5% of the brain is dedicated to odors, in dogs this figure is 33%. Dogs can detect odors 9 orders of magnitude more faint than humans, who can detect odors up to 1 ppb.

== Conditions affecting ability ==
Many factors can affect a dog's ability to smell, including age, sex, breed, disease, diet and environmental conditions. As dogs grow older, their performance and ability to learn new smells is reduced. Male dogs have a keener sense of smell than female dogs during tracking when determining the direction of a scent trail. A variety of diseases can decrease a dog's sense of smell, such as canine distemper and nasal mites. Dogs have an enhanced sense of smell when fed a high-fat, low-protein diet. There are a number of theories for this.

Humidity improves a dog's ability to detect scents, due to lingering odors trapped by water vapor and increased humidity within the dog's nose. Higher temperatures increase the presence of odor molecules in the air, especially at the level of a dog's nose, but kill bacteria useful in detecting scents and can decrease a dog's ability to work.

Wind also has an effect on a dog's sense of smell. Winds which are too low decrease effective range, while winds which are too high make detection difficult. The optimal range is 3 to 10 km/h. Turbulence reduces a dog's ability to track scents.

== Use of ability by humans ==
Humans learned to use dogs' exceptional sense of smell, primarily for hunting but also, more recently, for diverse types of searches.

=== Law enforcement ===
Many dogs are used by law enforcement officers (such as police or customs officers) to find or detect corpses, blood, explosives, illegal drugs, contraband electronics or large amounts of money which are hard to find or deliberately hidden. They may be transported to crime or accident scenes, usually seated at the back of an adapted law enforcement vehicle. They may, alternatively, work at a fixed location, for example at a customs station or airport.

=== Rescue ===
Dogs have been used for search and rescue operations.

=== Detection of disease ===
Some studies have found that certain dogs are able to detect diseases among human beings, notably cancer. The British medical journal The Lancet, suggested for the first time in 1989 the use of dogs to detect cancer.

=== Hunting dogs ===
Employed for various purposes in hound-hunting, the hunting dog is above all used for its tracking abilities, that is finding and sniffing out prey.

=== Truffle dogs ===
This type of dog has been trained and raised to find truffles buried in the ground.

== Competitions ==
There are scent work trials available in multiple different countries, which test the dogs ability to find and indicate odours to the handler. The scents used in these classes, called target odors are:

- Birch (Betula lenta)
- Anise (Pimpinella anisum)
- Clove (Eugenia caryophyllata)
- Cypress (Cupressus sempevirens)

The American Kennel Club has 4 different search environments: Container, Interior, Exterior, Buried. There is also an advanced level, called detective for high-achieving dogs. In this level, the search includes a mix of all the search environments.

== See also ==
- Scent hound
- Sighthound
- Dog anatomy
