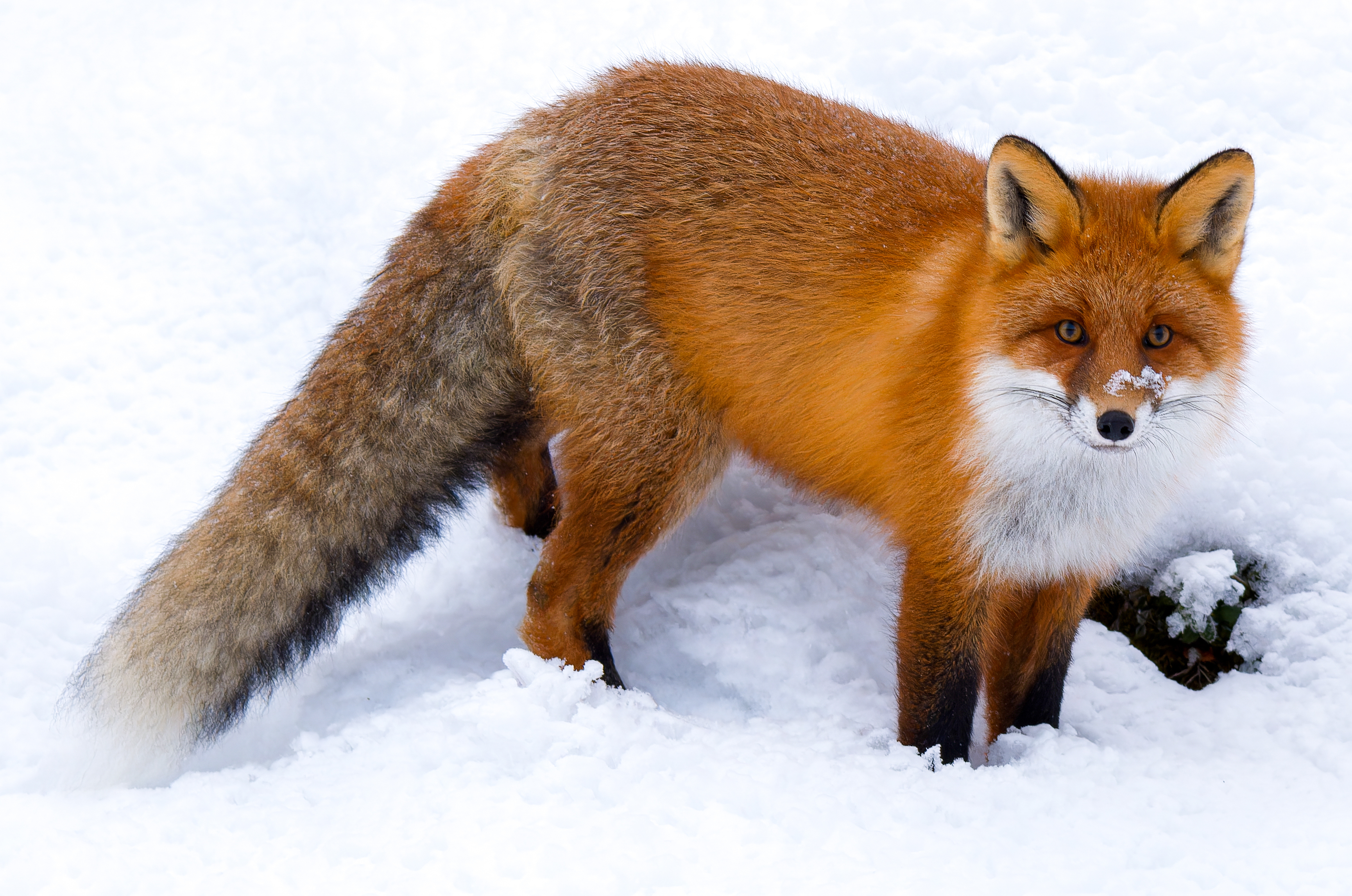
- In Rautas Fjällurskog Nature Reserve, Sweden

Conservation status
- Least Concern (IUCN 3.1)

- Secure (NatureServe)

Scientific classification
- Kingdom: Animalia
- Phylum: Chordata
- Class: Mammalia
- Order: Carnivora
- Family: Canidae
- Genus: Vulpes
- Species: V. vulpes

Binomial name
- Vulpes vulpes (Linnaeus, 1758)

Subspecies
- 46 subspecies
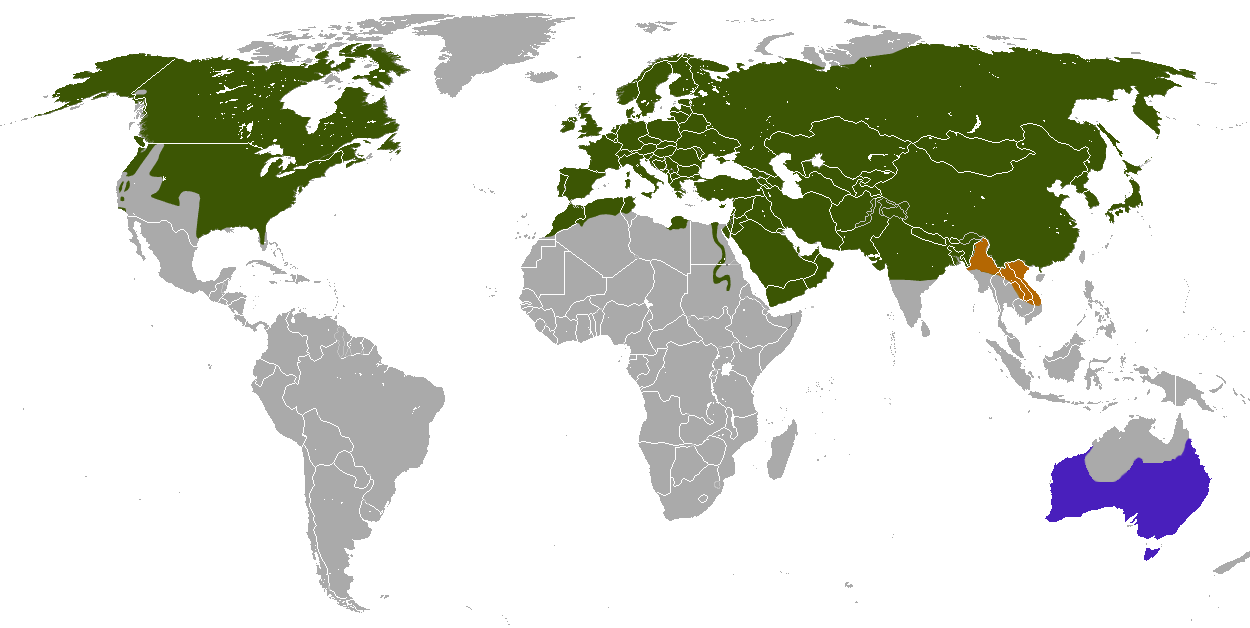
- Distribution of the red fox native introduced presence uncertain

Synonyms
- Canis vulpes Linnaeus, 1758; Canis alopex Linnaeus, 1758

Audio
- Calls

= Red fox =

Red fox Temporal range: 0.7 Ma Middle Pleistocene – present

Species of mammal

The red fox (Vulpes vulpes) is the largest of the true foxes, and the most widely distributed member of the order Carnivora. It is present across the entire Northern Hemisphere, including most of Europe, Asia, and North America, as well as parts of North Africa. Its range has expanded alongside human settlement, with the species having been introduced into Australia, where it preys on native small and medium-sized rodents and marsupials. The red fox is listed as of Least Concern on the IUCN Red List. Because of its impact on native species, it is included on the list of the "world's 100 worst invasive species".

The red fox originated in Eurasia during the Middle Pleistocene 400,000 years ago and later colonised North America sometime prior to 130,000 years ago. Apart from its large size, the red fox is distinguished from other species of foxes by its ability to adapt quickly to new environments. Despite its name, the species often produces individuals with other colours, including melanistic and leucistic ones. Forty-six subspecies are currently recognised, which can be divided into two categories: the large northern foxes and the small, basal southern grey desert foxes of North Africa and Asia.

The red fox usually occurs in pairs or in small family groups consisting of a mated pair and their young, or a male with several females related to each other. The young of the mated pair stay with their parents to help care for the new kits. The red fox primarily feeds on small rodents, though it also hunts rabbits, squirrels, game birds, reptiles, invertebrates and young ungulates. It also eats fruit and vegetables. Although it tends to kill smaller predators, including other species of foxes, it is itself vulnerable to attacks from predators, such as the golden eagle, the Eurasian goshawk, Bonelli's eagle, the Eurasian eagle-owl, the long-tailed weasel, the stoat, the striped skunk, the American mink, snakes, and martens.

The red fox has been extensively hunted as a pest and fur-bearer for many centuries, and is represented in human folklore and mythology. Due to its widespread distribution and large population, the red fox is one of the most important fur-bearing animals harvested for the fur trade. Too small to pose a significant threat to humans, it has greatly benefited from the presence of human habitation, and has successfully colonised many suburban and urban areas. The domestication of the red fox is also underway in Russia, and has resulted in the domesticated silver fox (Vulpes vulpes forma amicus).

== Terminology ==
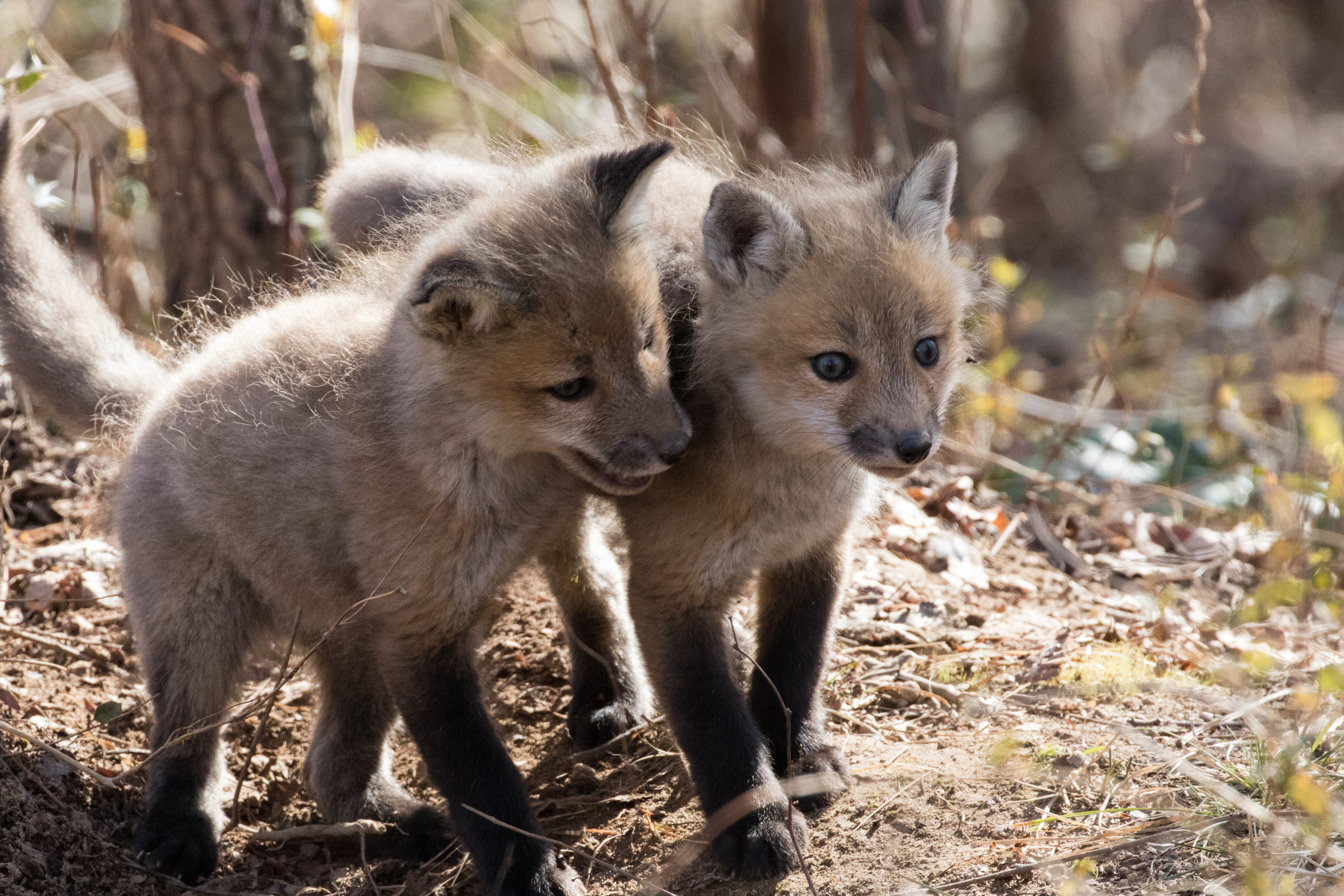
Young red foxes are called kits, pups, or cubs

Male red foxes are called dogs, tods, or reynards, females are called vixens, and young are called kits, pups, or cubs. Although the Arctic fox has a small native population in northern Scandinavia, and while the corsac fox's range extends into European Russia, the red fox is the only fox native to Western Europe. For this reason, it is simply called "the fox" in colloquial British English.

=== Etymology ===
The word "fox" comes from Old English, which in turn derived from Proto-Germanic *fuhsaz. Compare with West Frisian foks, Dutch vos, and German fuchs. This, in turn, derives from Proto-Indo-European *puḱ- 'thick-haired; tail'. Compare to the Hindi pū̃ch 'tail', Tocharian B päkā 'tail; chowrie', and Lithuanian pūkas 'fur / fluff'. The red fox's bushy tail also forms the basis for its Welsh name, llwynog, literally 'bushy', from llwyn 'bush'. Likewise, Portuguese: raposa from rabo 'tail', Lithuanian uodẽgis from uodegà 'tail', and Ojibwe waagosh from waa, which refers to the up and down "bounce" or flickering of an animal or its tail.

The scientific term vulpes derives from the Latin word for fox, and gives the adjectives vulpine and vulpecular.

== Evolution ==
The red fox is Eurasian in origin and may have evolved from either Vulpes alopecoides or the related Chinese V. chikushanensis, both of which lived during the Middle Villafranchian of the Pleistocene Epoch. The earliest fossil red fox specimens were uncovered in Baranya County, Hungary, dating from 3.4 to 1.8 million years ago. The ancestral red fox was likely more diminutive compared to today's extant red foxes, as the earliest red fox fossils have shown a smaller build than living specimens. The earliest fossil remains of the modern red fox date back to the Middle Pleistocene, found in association with middens and refuse left by early human settlements. This has led to the theory that the red fox was hunted by primitive humans as both a source of food and pelts; the possibility also exists of red foxes scavenging from middens or butchered animal carcasses.

The sister lineage to the red fox is Rüppell's fox, but the two species are surprisingly closely related through mitochondrial DNA markers, with Rüppell's fox nested within the red fox lineage. Such a nesting of one species within another is called paraphyly. Several hypotheses have been suggested to explain this, including (1) recent divergence of Rüppell's fox from a red fox lineage, (2) incomplete lineage sorting, or introgression of mtDNA between the two species. Based on the fossil record, the last scenario seems the most likely. This is further supported by the clear ecological and morphological differences between the two species.

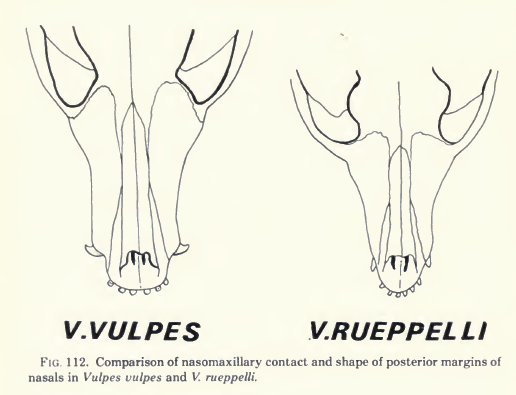
Comparative illustration of skulls of the red fox (left) and Rüppell's fox (right): note the more developed facial area of the former

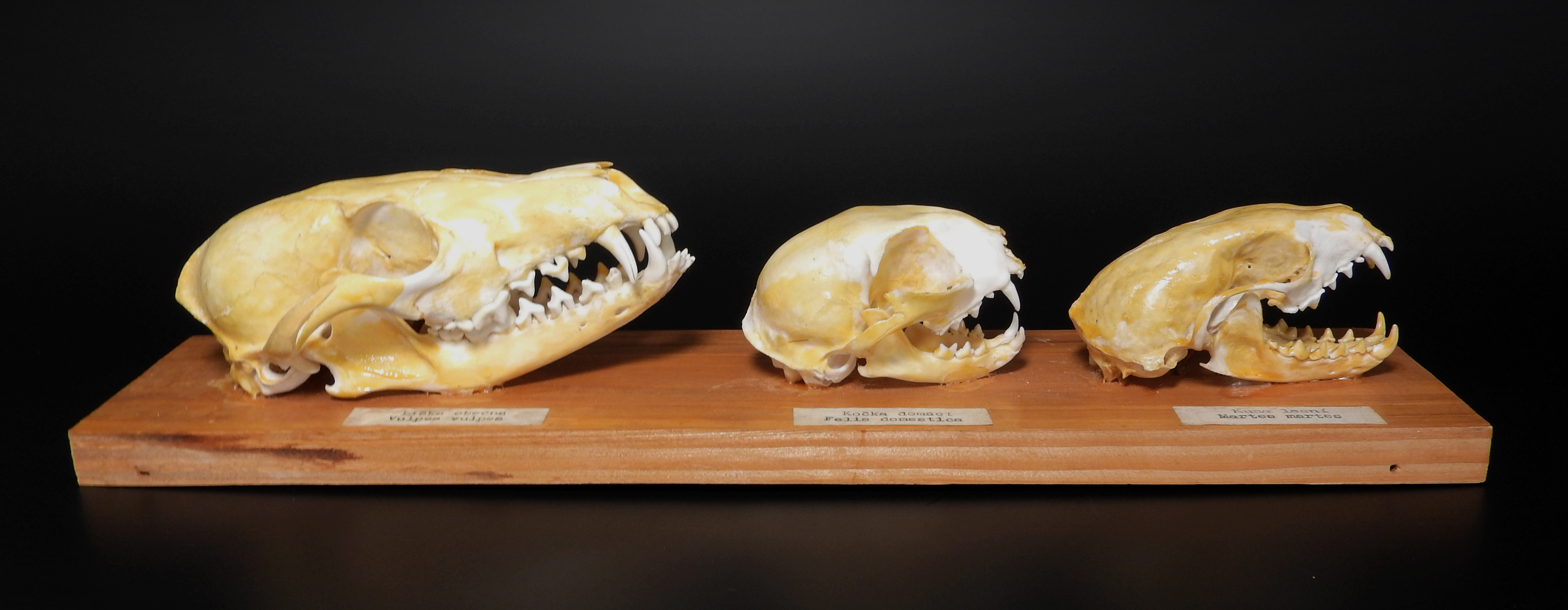
Comparison of a red fox's skull with those of other carnivorans. Left to right: red fox, domestic cat, European pine marten

The red fox is one of 12 extant species in the genus Vulpes and a member of the family Canidae. The cladogram below is based on the phylogeny of Lindblad-Toh (2005) modified to incorporate recent findings on Vulpes.

The red fox within the genus Vulpes
- Vulpes
  - - Vulpes zerda (Fennec fox)
    - Vulpes cana (Blanford's fox)
  - - Vulpes chama (Cape fox)
    - - - - Vulpes vulpes (Red fox)
          - Vulpes rueppellii (Rüppell's fox)
        - - Vulpes corsac (Corsac fox)
          - Vulpes ferrilata (Tibetan fox)
      - - Vulpes macrotis (Kit fox)
        - Vulpes lagopus (Arctic fox)

=== Colonisation of North America ===
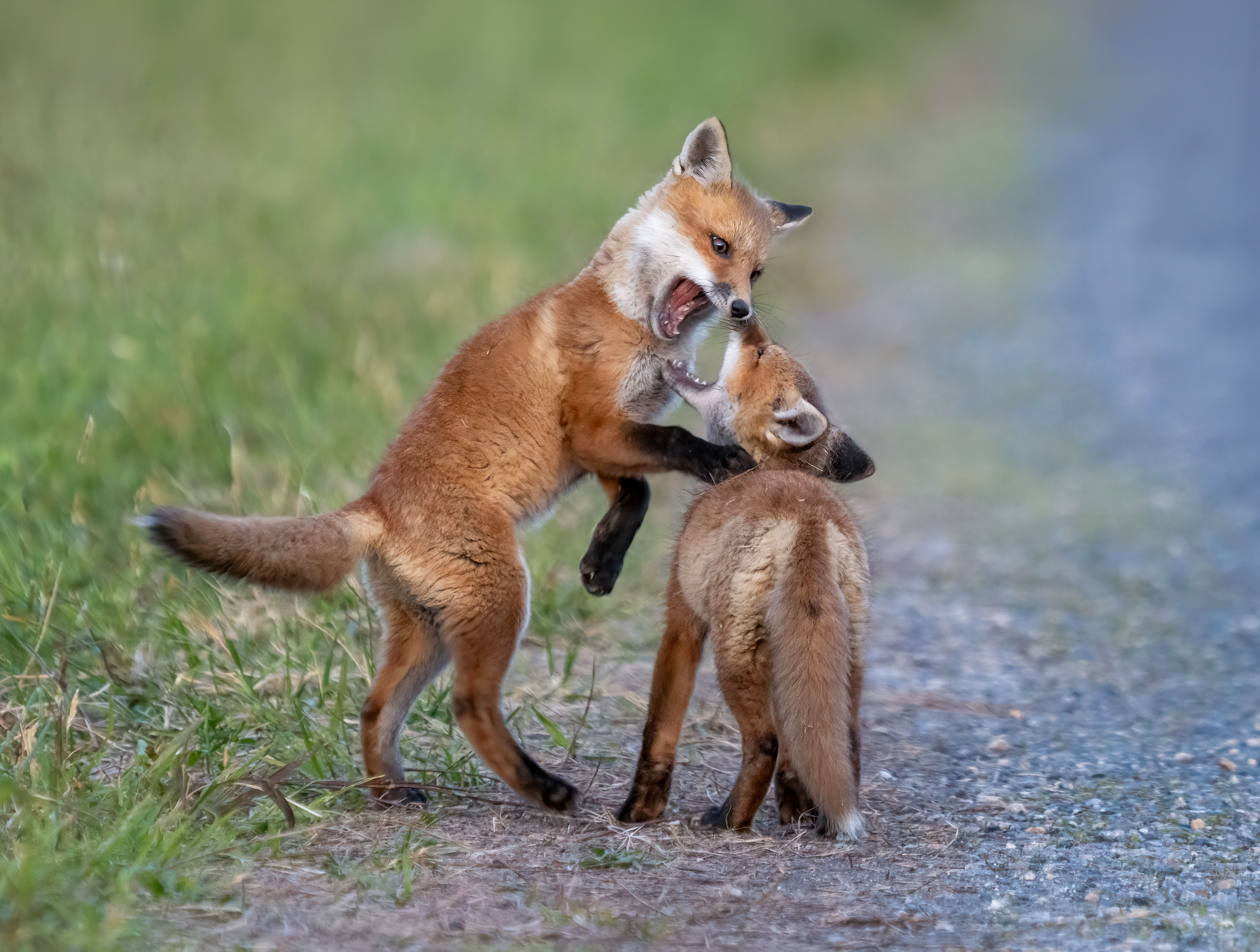
Two red fox kits playing in Delaware, U.S.

Red foxes colonised the North American continent in two waves: before and during the Illinoian glaciation, and during the Wisconsin glaciation about 130,000 years ago. Gene mapping demonstrates that red foxes in North America have been isolated from their Old World counterparts for over 400,000 years, thus raising the possibility that speciation actually has occurred, and that the previous binomial name of Vulpes fulva may be valid after all. In the Far North, red fox fossils have been found in Sangamonian Stage deposits near the Fairbanks District, Alaska, and Medicine Hat, Alberta. Fossils dating from the Wisconsin are present in 25 sites across Arkansas, California, Colorado, Idaho, Missouri, New Mexico, Ohio, Tennessee, Texas, Virginia, and Wyoming. Although they ranged far south during the Wisconsin, the onset of warm conditions shrank their range toward the north, and they have only recently reclaimed their former North American ranges because of human-induced environmental changes. Genetic testing indicates that two distinct red fox refugia exist in North America, which have been separated since the Wisconsin. The northern (or boreal) refugium occurs in Alaska and western Canada, and consists of the larger subspecies V. v. abietorum, V. v. alascensis, V. v. harrimanni, V. v. kenaiensis, V. v. regalis, and V. v. rubricosa. The southern (or montane) refugium occurs in both the alpine meadows and the subalpine parklands of the west from the Rocky Mountains to the Cascade Range and the Sierra Nevada, and consists of the smaller subspecies V. v. cascadensis, V. v. macroura, V. v. necator, and V. v. patwin. The latter clade has been isolated from all other red fox populations since the Last Glacial Maximum (LGM) and may have developed unique ecological or physiological adaptations.

Although European foxes (V. v. crucigera) were introduced to parts of the United States in the 1900s, genetic research suggests that there are no European fox mitochondrial haplotypes present in any North American populations. Additionally, introduced eastern American red foxes (V. v. fulva) have colonised most of inland California from Southern California to the San Joaquin Valley, Monterey and the northern coastal San Francisco Bay Area (including urban San Francisco and the adjacent cities). In spite of the red fox's adaptability to city life, they are still found in somewhat greater numbers in the northern portions of California (north of the Bay Area) than in the south, as the wilderness is more alpine and isolated. The eastern American red fox appears to have mixed with the Sacramento Valley red fox (V. v. patwin) only in a narrow hybrid zone. In addition, no evidence has been seen of interbreeding of eastern American red foxes in California with the montane Sierra Nevada red fox (V. v. necator) or other populations in the Intermountain West (the area between the Rocky Mountains to the east and both the Cascade Range and the Sierra Nevada to the west).

== Subspecies ==
The third edition of Mammal Species of the World listed 45 subspecies as valid. In 2010, a distinct 46th subspecies, the Sacramento Valley red fox (V. v. patwin), which inhabits the grasslands of the Sacramento Valley, was identified through mitochondrial haplotype studies. Castelló (2018) recognized 30 subspecies of the Old World red fox and nine subspecies of the North American red fox as valid.

It is known that substantial gene pool mixing occurs between different subspecies. For example, British red foxes have crossbred extensively with red foxes imported from Germany, France, Belgium, Sardinia and possibly Siberia and Scandinavia. However, genetic studies suggest little differences between red foxes sampled across Europe. Lack of genetic diversity is consistent with the red fox being a highly agile species, with one red fox covering 320 km (200 mi) in under one year's time.

Heptner & Naumov (1998) divide subspecies in Eurasia and North Africa into two categories based on morphological features:

- Northern foxes are large and brightly coloured.
- Southern grey desert foxes include the Asian subspecies V. v. griffithi, V. v. pusilla, and V. v. flavescens. These foxes display transitional features between the northern foxes and other, smaller species of foxes; their skulls possess more primitive, neotenous traits than the northern foxes and they are much smaller; the maximum sizes attained by southern grey desert foxes are invariably less than the average sizes attained by northern foxes. Also, their limbs are longer and their ears are larger.

Red foxes living in Middle Asia show physical traits that are intermediate between the two categories.

Table of the subspecies of the red fox
Subspecies	Trinomial authority	Length (Note: Not including tail length) Weight Height (Note: At the shoulder)	Description	Range	Synonyms (Note: Latin names with more than 5 synonyms are grouped into footnotes)
Scandinavian red fox V. v. vulpes (nominate subspecies)	Linnaeus; 1758	70–90 cm (28–35 in); 5–10 kg (11–22 lb); 35–40 cm (14–16 in)	Large. Its fur is bright orange with a strongly developed whitish and yellow ripple on the lower back. The teeth are larger than those of more southern-ranging subspecies, and the tail is wide and fluffy. Dogs are larger than vixens.	Scandinavia and the northern and middle forests of the European part of the former Soviet Union, southwards to the forest-steppe and eastwards to the Ural Mountains; possibly also in Central and Western Europe	(Note: alopex (Linnaeus 1758); communis (Burnett 1829); lineatus (Billberg 1827); nigro-argenteus (Nilsson 1820); nigrocaudatus (Billberg 1827); septentrionalis (Brass 1911); variegates (Billberg 1827); vulgaris (Oken 1816))
British Columbian red fox V. v. abietorum	Merriam; 1900	56–80 cm (22–31 in); 5–6.5 kg (11–14 lb); 35–40 cm (14–16 in)	Large. Larger tail, longer fur, longer neck, and slightly smaller ears compared to other North American red foxes. The fur is golden or fulvous and sometimes has less black on the legs than other subspecies do. Similar in appearance to V. v. alascensis (see below), but with a lighter, longer and thinner head. Dogs are larger than vixens.	The southern Yukon, the Northwest Territories, northern Alberta, the interior of British Columbia and the adjoining coast of southeastern Alaska	sitkaensis (Brass 1911)
Northern Alaska fox V. v. alascensis	Merriam; 1900	56–82 cm (22–32 in); 2.7–6.8 kg (6.0–15.0 lb); 35–50 cm (14–20 in)	Related to V. v. harrimani and V. v. kenaiensis (see both below). Large. A long-tailed and small-eared subspecies with golden-fulvous fur. Similar in appearance to V. v. abietorum (see above), but with a shorter and wider head. Both silver and cross colour morphs are common in this subspecies.	The Andreafsky Wilderness in southwestern Alaska, the Northwest Territories, and the Yukon	
Eastern Transcaucasian fox V. v. alpherakyi	Satunin; 1906	50 cm (20 in); 4 kg (8.8 lb); 35.5 cm (14.0 in)	Small, with long, slender legs and a small, pointed muzzle. The coat is short, coarse and sparse. The fur is rusty grey or fulvous, with a brighter rusty stripe along the spine, and streaked with black and white. There is more black on the legs than other subspecies have, and there is a black band from the eyes to the lips. The belly and chest are grey.	All around the Caspian Sea and the Caucasian steppe from Tbilisi (Georgia) through Kazakhstan and into Turkmenistan	
Anatolian fox V. v. anatolica	Thomas; 1920	46.5–65 cm (18.3–25.6 in); 2.2–3.2 kg (4.9–7.1 lb); 35 cm (14 in)	Medium-sized. The fur is pale yellow, light grey, red, or brown. Its fur has less red than other subspecies. The ears and tail are long.	Turkey	
Arabian red fox V. v. arabica	Thomas; 1920	52–63 cm (20–25 in); 2.4–3.2 kg (5.3–7.1 lb); 32.5–37.5 cm (12.8–14.8 in)	The smallest red fox subspecies of all. It has short, pale red or brown fur. The ears are large, and have black tips. The legs are the same colour as the rest of the body.	Widely ranging across the Arabian Peninsula, includes Saudi Arabia, the United Arab Emirates, Yemen, Qatar, Kuwait, Oman and Jordan; possibly also in Iraq and Israel	
Atlas fox V. v. atlantica	Wagner; 1841	46.5–64.2 cm (18.3–25.3 in); 1.8–3.8 kg (4.0–8.4 lb); 35 cm (14 in)		The Atlas Mountains in Algeria and Tunisia	algeriensis (Loche 1858)
Labrador fox V. v. bangsi	Merriam; 1900	57.9–74.5 cm (22.8–29.3 in); 3.6–7.3 kg (7.9–16.1 lb); 35–45 cm (14–18 in)	Similar in appearance to V. v. fulva, but with smaller ears and less pronounced black markings on the ears and at the legs.	Northern Quebec, coastal Labrador and Newfoundland	
Barbary fox V. v. barbara	Shaw; 1800	46.5–64.2 cm (18.3–25.3 in); 1.8–3.8 kg (4.0–8.4 lb); 35 cm (14 in)		The Barbary Coast of Northwestern Africa	acaab (Cabrera 1916)
Anadyr fox V. v. beringiana	Middendorff; 1875	63.8–72 cm (25.1–28.3 in); 3.3–6 kg (7.3–13.2 lb); 35 cm (14 in)	Large. The most brightly coloured of the Old World red foxes, with the fur being saturated bright reddish and almost lacking the bright ripple along the back and flanks. The coat is fluffy and soft.	The shores of the Bering Strait, northeastern Siberia, the Kamchatka Peninsula and Anadyrsky District	anadyrensis (J. A. Allen 1903) beringensis (Merriam 1902) kamtschadensis (Brass 1911) kamtschatica (Dybowski 1922) schantaricus (Yudin 1986)
Cascade red fox V. v. cascadensis	Merriam; 1900	56–71 cm (22–28 in); 3.5–4.5 kg (7.7–9.9 lb); 38–44 cm (15–17 in)	A short-tailed and small-toothed subspecies with yellow rather than fulvous fur; this is the subspecies that is the most likely to produce cross colour morphs.	The Cascade Range, the northern Sierra Nevada and southern British Columbia	
North Caucasus fox V. v. caucasica	Dinnik; 1914	50–80 cm (20–31 in); 4 kg (8.8 lb); 35.5 cm (14.0 in)	Large. The coat is variable in colour, ranging from reddish to red-grey and nearly grey. The fur is short and coarse. This subspecies may actually be a hybrid population that was created by crossbreeding between V. v. stepensis and V. v. karagan (see both below).	The North Caucasus, Transcaucasia and northern Ossetia	
European fox V. v. crucigera	Bechstein; 1789	62–72 cm (24–28 in); 5.4–6.7 kg (12–15 lb); 35–40 cm (14–16 in)	Medium-sized. Its yellowish-fulvous or reddish-brown pelt lacks the whitish shading on the upper back. The tail is not grey, as in most other red fox subspecies. It is primarily distinguished from V. v. vulpes by its slightly smaller size, distinctly smaller teeth and widely spaced premolars. Red foxes present in Great Britain and Australia are usually ascribed to this subspecies, though many populations there display a great degree of tooth compaction that is not present in Continental European red fox populations.	All of Europe except Scandinavia, the Iberian Peninsula and some islands of the Mediterranean Sea; introduced into Australia and North America	(Note: alba (Borkhausen 1797); cinera (Bechstein 1801); diluta (Ognev 1924); europaeus (Kerr 1792); hellenica (Douma-Petridou and Ondrias 1980); hypomelas (Wagner 1841); lutea (Bechstein 1801); melanogaster (Bonaparte 1832); meridionalis (Fitzinger 1855); nigra (Borkhausen 1797); stepensis (Brauner 1914))
Transbaikal fox V. v. daurica	Ognev; 1931	63.8–72 cm (25.1–28.3 in); 3.3–6 kg (7.3–13.2 lb); 35 cm (14 in)	Large. The colour along its spine is light, dull yellowish-reddish with a strongly developed white ripple and greyish longitudinal stripes on the anterior side of the limbs. The coat is coarse but fluffy.	Buryatia, Kyakhta, southern Transbaikal, southern Siberia and northern Mongolia	ussuriensis (Dybowski 1922)
Newfoundland fox V. v. deletrix	Bangs; 1898	57.9–74.5 cm (22.8–29.3 in); 3.6–7.3 kg (7.9–16.1 lb); 35–45 cm (14–18 in)	A pale-coloured subspecies. Its light, straw-yellow fur deepens to golden yellow or buff-fulvous in some places. The tail lacks the usual black basal spot. The hind feet and claws are large.	Newfoundland	
Ussuri fox V. v. dolichocrania	Ognev; 1926	63.8–72 cm (25.1–28.3 in); 3.3–6 kg (7.3–13.2 lb); 35 cm (14 in)		Southwestern Primorsky Krai, Amur Oblast and southeastern Russia	ognevi (Yudin 1986)
V. v. dorsalis	J.E. Gray; 1838			Southern Germany	
Turkmenian fox or Turkmen fox V. v. flavescens	J. E. Gray; 1838	46.5–65 cm (18.3–25.6 in); 2.2–3.2 kg (4.9–7.1 lb); 35 cm (14 in)	Small, with an infantile-looking skull and an overall grey-coloured coat.	Iran; possibly in Iraq, Turkmenistan, Uzbekistan, Afghanistan and Pakistan	cinerascens (Birula 1913) splendens (Thomas 1902)
Eastern American red fox V. v. fulva	Desmarest; 1820	60–71.8 cm (23.6–28.3 in); 3.5–5.4 kg (7.7–11.9 lb); 40 cm (16 in)	Smaller than V. v. vulpes, with a smaller, sharper face, a shorter tail, a lighter pelt more profusely mixed with whitish underparts and darker legs.	The Eastern United States and eastern Canada	pennsylvanicus (Rhoads 1894)
Afghan red fox V. v. griffithi	Blyth; 1854	56.9–75.2 cm (22.4–29.6 in); 3.6–5.1 kg (7.9–11.2 lb); 35 cm (14 in)	Slightly smaller than V. v. montana; it has a more extensively hoary and silvered pelt.	Afghanistan to western Kashmir	flavescens (Hutton 1845)
Kodiak fox V. v. harrimani	Merriam; 1900	56–82 cm (22–32 in); 2.7–6.8 kg (6.0–15.0 lb); 35–50 cm (14–20 in)	Large. It has an enormous tail and coarse, wolf-like fur on the tail and lower back. The hairs on the neck and shoulders are greatly elongated and form a ruff.	The Kodiak Archipelago in southern Alaska	
Southern Chinese fox V. v. hoole	R. Swinhoe; 1870	61.3 cm (24.1 in); 3.6–7 kg (7.9–15.4 lb); 35 cm (14 in)	Small. Similar in colour to V. v. crucigera, except the fur is a duller chestnut instead of orange, and the legs have less black.	Southern China	aurantioluteus (Matschie 1907) lineiventer (R. Swinhoe 1871)
Sardinian fox V. v. ichnusae	Miller; 1907	59–64 cm (23–25 in); 4.5–7 kg (9.9–15.4 lb); 35–50 cm (14–20 in)	Small, with darker fur than other subspecies and proportionately small ears.	Corsica and Sardinia	
Cyprus fox V. v. indutus	Miller; 1907	59–64 cm (23–25 in); 4.5–7 kg (9.9–15.4 lb); 35–50 cm (14–20 in)		Cyprus	
Yakutsk fox V. v. jakutensis	Ognev; 1923	63.8–72 cm (25.1–28.3 in); 3.3–6 kg (7.3–13.2 lb); 35 cm (14 in)	Large, but smaller than V. v. beringiana. The back, neck and shoulders are brownish-rusty, while the flanks are bright ocherous reddish-yellow.	Sakha, eastern Siberia	sibiricus (Dybowski 1922)
Japanese fox V. v. japonica	Ognev; 1923	51.5–70 cm (20.3–27.6 in); 3.3–6.6 kg (7.3–14.6 lb); 32.2–42.3 cm (12.7–16.7 in)		Japan except for Hokkaido	
Karagan red fox V. v. karagan	Erxleben; 1777	52–68.5 cm (20.5–27.0 in); 3.2–5.8 kg (7.1–12.8 lb); 35 cm (14 in)	Smaller than V. v. vulpes, its fur is short, coarse and of a light sandy-yellow or yellowish-grey colour.	Kazakhstan, Kyrgyzstan, Russia and Mongolia	ferganensis (Ognev 1926) melanotus (Pallas 1811) pamirensis (Ognev 1926) tarimensis (Matschie 1907)
Kenai Peninsula red fox V. v. kenaiensis	Merriam; 1900	56–82 cm (22–32 in); 2.7–6.8 kg (6.0–15.0 lb); 35–50 cm (14–20 in)	One of the largest North American red fox subspecies. It has softer fur than V. v. harrimani.	The Kenai Peninsula in southern Alaska	
Kurdistan red fox or Transcaucasian fox V. v. kurdistanica	Satunin; 1906	50–80 cm (20–31 in); 4 kg (8.8 lb); 35.5 cm (14.0 in)	Intermediate in size between V. v. alpheryaki and V. v. caucasica; its fur is pale yellow or light grey, sometimes brownish-reddish and is fluffier and denser than that of the other two Caucasian red fox subspecies.	Northeastern Turkey, Armenia and Kurdistan	alticola (Ognev 1926)
Wasatch Mountains fox V. v. macroura	Baird; 1852	55.8–68.5 cm (22.0–27.0 in); 3.2–6.8 kg (7.1–15.0 lb); 38.1–40.6 cm (15.0–16.0 in)	Similar in appearance to V. v. fulva, but with a much longer tail, larger hind feet and more extensive blackening of the legs.	The Wasatch Mountains and the Rocky Mountains from southern Alberta; includes all of Yellowstone National Park	
Himalayan red fox V. v. montana	Pearson; 1836	56.9–75.2 cm (22.4–29.6 in); 3.6–5.1 kg (7.9–11.2 lb); 35 cm (14 in)	Distinguished from V. v. vulpes by its smaller size, proportionately smaller skull and teeth and coarser fur. The hairs on the soles of its feet are copiously mixed with softer, woolly hairs.	The Himalayas and the northern Indian subcontinent	alopex (Blanford 1888) himalaicus (Ogilby 1837) ladacensis (Matschie 1907) nepalensis (J. E. Gray 1837) waddelli (Bonhote 1906)
Sierra Nevada red fox or High Sierra fox V. v. necator	Merriam; 1900	56.9–75.2 cm (22.4–29.6 in); 3.6–5.1 kg (7.9–11.2 lb); 35 cm (14 in)	Similar in appearance to V. v. fulva, but with a short tail. Cranially, it resembles V. v. macroura more than it does V. v. fulva. There is not much black on the legs. Both silver and cross colour morphs are common in this subspecies.	Only two groups of this subspecies remain, one in Lassen Volcanic National Park and the other in Yosemite National Park; occurs in alpine areas both near and above the tree line	
Nile fox V. v. niloticus	E. Geoffroy Saint-Hilaire; 1803	76.7–105.3cm 1.8–3.8kg	Small. The fur is ruddy to grey-brown above and darker on the back of the neck. The flanks are greyer and tinged with buff. It is larger than V. v. arabica and V. v. palaestina.	The coast of Egypt and along the Nile down to northern Sudan and northern Libya	aegyptiacus (Sonnini 1816) anubis (Hemprich and Ehrenberg 1833) vulpecula (Hemprich and Ehrenberg 1833)
Tian Shan fox V. v. ochroxantha	Ognev; 1926	52–68.5 cm (20.5–27.0 in); 3.2–5.8 kg (7.1–12.8 lb); 35 cm (14 in)		The Tian Shan and the Dzungarian Alatau	
Palestinian fox V. v. palaestina	Thomas; 1920	45.5–62.5 cm (17.9–24.6 in); 2–4 kg (4.4–8.8 lb); 35 cm (14 in)	Small. The fur is a dull red or slate grey with red or brown tinges, especially around the face. It is sometimes considered to be the same subspecies as V. v. arabica, but genetic analysis has not yet been conducted in order to prove that they are separate from each other.	Palestine, Israel, Lebanon and Syria. Its range's boundaries with those of V. v. arabica, V. v. aegyptiacus, V. v. flavescens and V. v. pusilla are currently unclear. V. v. palaestina is the prevailing subspecies along the Mediterranean Sea from Ramleh and Jerusalem up to Lebanon.	
Sacramento Valley red fox V. v. patwin	Sacks et al, 2010		Similar in appearance to V. v. fulva, but with a short tail. Cranially, it resembles V. v. macroura more than it does V. v. fulva.	The Sacramento Valley, California	
Korean fox or Korean red fox V. v. peculiosa	Kishida; 1924	57–60 cm (22–24 in); 3.5–4.7 kg (7.7–10.4 lb); 38 cm (15 in)		Korea	kiyomassai (Kishida and Mori 1929)
White-footed fox or desert fox V. v. pusilla	Blyth; 1854	48.2–57.9 cm (19.0–22.8 in); 2–5 kg (4.4–11.0 lb); 35 cm (14 in)	Slightly smaller than V. v. griffithii. It closely resembles the Bengal fox (V. bengalensis) in size, but it is distinguished from it by its longer tail and its hind feet.	Iraq, southern Iran, Sindh, Balochistan, Punjab and western India	leucopus (Blyth 1854) persicus (Blanford 1875)
Northern plains fox V. v. regalis	Merriam; 1900	65.8–69.7 cm (25.9–27.4 in); 3.2–11.3 kg (7.1–24.9 lb); 38–45 cm (15–18 in)	The largest North American red fox subspecies. It has large and broad ears and a long tail. The fur is a golden-yellow colour. The feet are pure black.	Central Canada from eastern Alberta to the western edge of the Great Lakes and north to Manitoba. From Minnesota south to Missouri. Possibly in Nunavut.	
Nova Scotia fox V. v. rubricosa	Bangs; 1898	57.9–74.5 cm (22.8–29.3 in); 3.6–7.3 kg (7.9–16.1 lb); 35–45 cm (14–18 in)	Large. It has a large, broad tail and larger teeth and a larger rostrum than V. v. fulva does; it is also the deepest-coloured subspecies.	Eastern Ontario from the eastern edge of Lake Superior, central Quebec to the southern edge of James Bay, Newfoundland and Labrador, New Brunswick and Prince Edward Island, Nova Scotia	bangsi (Merriam 1900) deletrix (Bangs 1898) rubricos (Churcher 1960) vafra (Bangs 1897)
Ezo red fox V. v. schrencki	Kishida; 1924	78 cm (31 in); 4–6.2 kg (8.8–13.7 lb); 31.9–28.7 cm (12.6–11.3 in)	Large. Differentiated from V. v. japonica by its larger size, narrower skull, and larger teeth.	Hokkaido, Sakhalin and the southern Kuril Islands	
Iberian fox V. v. silacea	Miller; 1907	60–80 cm (24–31 in); 3.1–8.6 kg (6.8–19.0 lb); 35–50 cm (14–20 in)	Though equal in size to V. v. vulpes, it has smaller teeth and more widely spaced premolars. The fur is dull buff without any yellowish or reddish tints. The hindquarters are frosted with white and the tail is clear grey in colour.	The Iberian Peninsula	
Kuril Islands fox V. v. splendidissima	Kishida; 1924	78 cm (31 in); 4–6.2 kg (8.8–13.7 lb); 31.9–28.7 cm (12.6–11.3 in)		The northern and central Kuril Islands	
Steppe red fox V. v. stepensis	Brauner; 1914	62–72 cm (24–28 in); 5.4–6.7 kg (12–15 lb); 35–40 cm (14–16 in)	Slightly smaller and more lightly coloured than V. v. crucigera, with shorter, coarser fur. Individuals from the Crimean Mountains have brighter, fluffier and denser fur.	The steppes near Kherson, Ukraine	krymeamontana (Brauner 1914) crymensis (Brauner 1914)
Tobolsk fox V. v. tobolica	Ognev; 1926	62–72 cm (24–28 in); 5.4–6.7 kg (12–15 lb); 35–40 cm (14–16 in)	Large. It has yellowish-rusty or dirty-reddish fur with a well-developed cross and often a black area on the belly. The coat is long and fluffy.	Salekhard and Tobolsk, Russia	
Northern Chinese fox V. v. tschiliensis	Matschie; 1907	61.3 cm (24.1 in); 3.6–7 kg (7.9–15.4 lb); 35 cm (14 in)	Slightly larger than V. v. hoole, but unlike that subspecies, it closely approaches V. v. vulpes in size.	Northern China	huli (Sowerby 1923)

== Description ==
=== Build ===
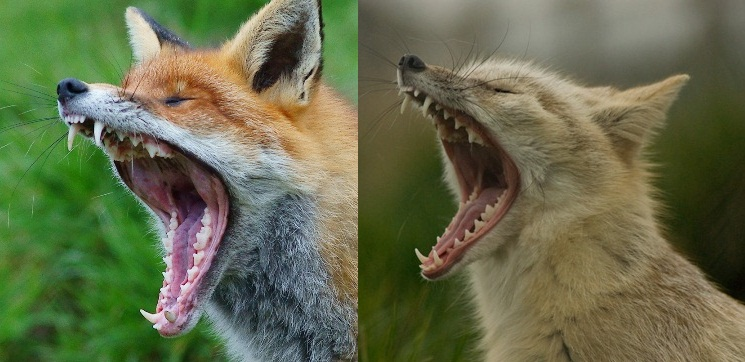
A red fox (left) and a corsac fox (right) yawning

The red fox has an elongated body and relatively short limbs. The tail, which is longer than half the body length (70% of both the head and the body length), is fluffy and reaches the ground when in a standing position. Their pupils are oval and vertically oriented. Nictitating membranes are present, but move only when the eyes are closed. The forepaws have five digits, while the hind feet have only four and lack dewclaws. They are very agile, being capable of jumping over 2 m (6 ft 7 in) high fences, and can swim well. Vixens normally have four pairs of teats, though vixens with seven, nine, or 10 teats are not uncommon. The testes of dogs are smaller than those of Arctic foxes.

Their skulls are fairly narrow and elongated, with small braincases. Their canine teeth are relatively long. Sexual dimorphism of the skull is more pronounced than in corsac foxes, with vixens tending to have smaller skulls than dogs, with wider nasal regions and hard palates, as well as having larger canine teeth. Their skulls are distinguished from those of similarly-sized domestic dogs by their narrower muzzles, less crowded premolars, more slender canine teeth, and concave rather than convex profiles.

=== Dimensions ===
The red fox is the largest of 12 extant species in the genus Vulpes. However, relative to their size, red foxes are much lighter than similarly-sized domestic dogs, a species in the genus Canis. For example, their limb bones weigh 30 percent less per unit area of bone than expected for similarly-sized domestic dogs. They display significant individual, sexual, age and geographical variation in size. On average, adults measure 35–50 cm (14–20 in) high at the shoulder and 45–90 cm (18–35 in) in body length with tails measuring 30–55.5 cm (11.8–21.9 in). The ears measure 7.7–12.5 cm (3.0–4.9 in) and the hind feet 12–18.5 cm (4.7–7.3 in). Weights range from 2.2–14 kg (4.9–30.9 lb), with vixens typically weighing 15–20% less than dogs. Dogs have skulls measuring 129–167 mm (5.1–6.6 in), while vixens have skulls measuring 128–159 mm (5.0–6.3 in). The forefoot print measures 60 mm (2.4 in) in length and 45 mm (1.8 in) in width, while the hind foot print measures 55 mm (2.2 in) long and 38 mm (1.5 in) wide. They trot at a speed of 6–13 km/h (3.7–8.1 mph), and have a maximum running speed of 50 km/h (31 mph). They have a stride of 25–35 cm (9.8–13.8 in) when walking at a normal pace. North American red foxes are generally lightly built, with comparatively long bodies for their mass and have a high degree of sexual dimorphism. British red foxes are heavily built, but short, while Continental European red foxes are closer to the general average among red fox populations. The largest red fox on record in Great Britain was a 1.4 m (4 ft 7 in) long male, that weighed 17.2 kg (38 lb), killed in Aberdeenshire, Scotland, in early 2012.

=== Fur ===
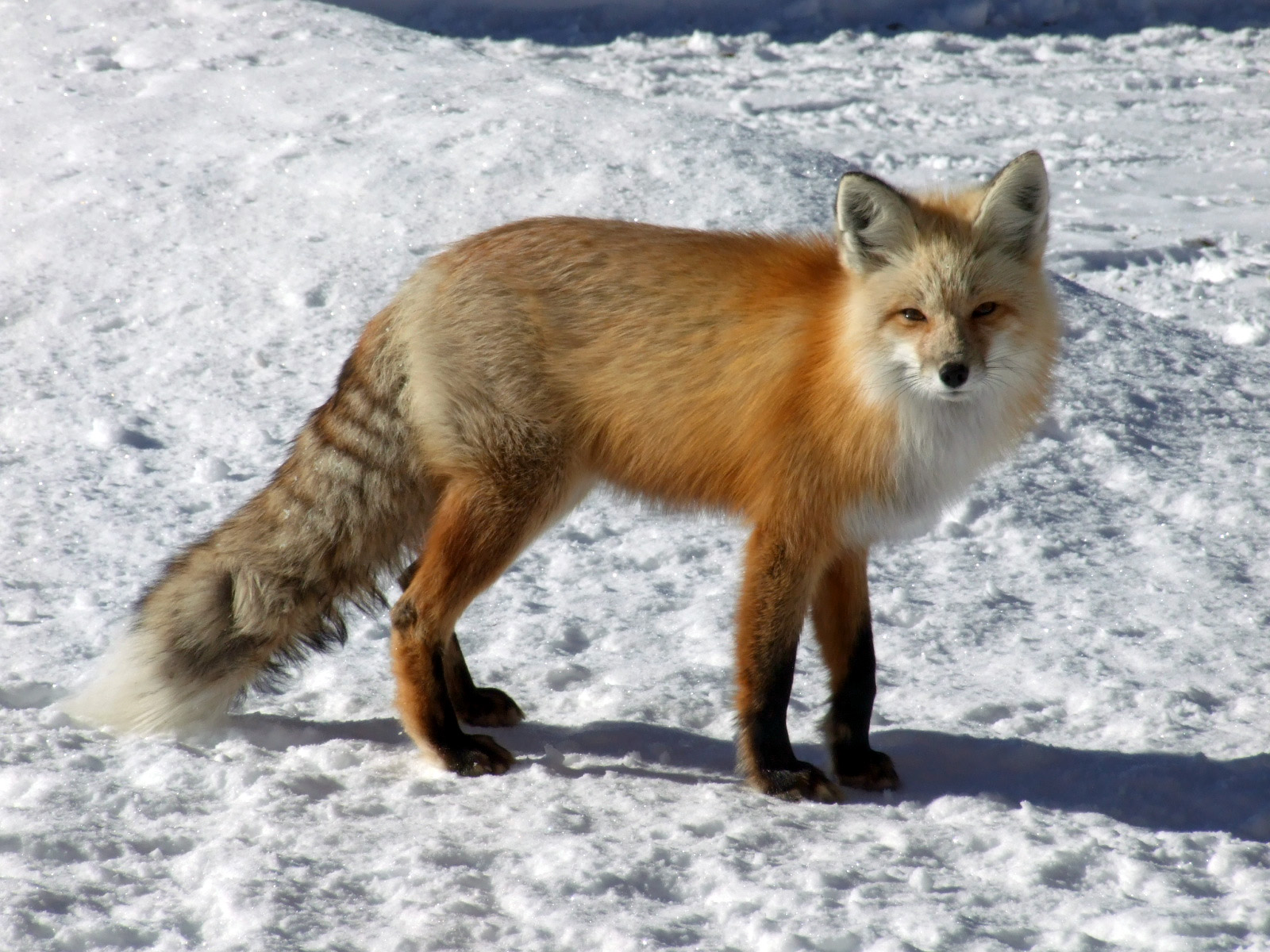
A red fox in its winter coat in the Rocky Mountains of Colorado, U.S.

The red fox's winter fur is dense, soft, silky and relatively long. In the northern foxes the fur is long, dense and fluffy, but it is shorter, sparser and coarser in the southern grey desert foxes. Among the northern foxes, the North American red foxes generally have the silkiest guard hairs, while most Eurasian red foxes have coarser fur. The fur on areas such as the head and lower legs, known as "thermal windows", is kept short and dense all year round, while the fur on other areas changes with the seasons. Red foxes actively control the peripheral vasodilation and peripheral vasoconstriction in these areas to regulate heat loss. There are three main colour morphs; red, silver / black and cross (see Colour morphs below). In the cross morph, their coats are usually bright reddish-rust colour with yellowish tints. Along the spine, there is a stripe of weak, diffuse patterns of brown, reddish and chestnut hairs. Two additional stripes run down the shoulder blades and, together with the spinal stripe, form a cross. The lower back is often a mottled silvery colour. The flanks are lighter coloured than the back, while the chin, lower lips, throat and front of the chest are white. The remaining lower surface of the body is dark, brown or reddish. During lactation, the belly fur of vixens may turn brick red. The upper parts of the limbs are rusty red, while the paws are black. The front of the face and the upper neck are bright brownish-red, while the upper lips are white. The backs of the ears are black or brownish-reddish, while the inner surface is whitish. The top of the tail is brownish-reddish, but lighter in colour than the back and flanks. The underside of the tail is pale grey with a straw-coloured tint. A black spot, the location of the supracaudal gland, is usually present at the base of the tail. The tip of the tail is white.

==== Colour morphs ====
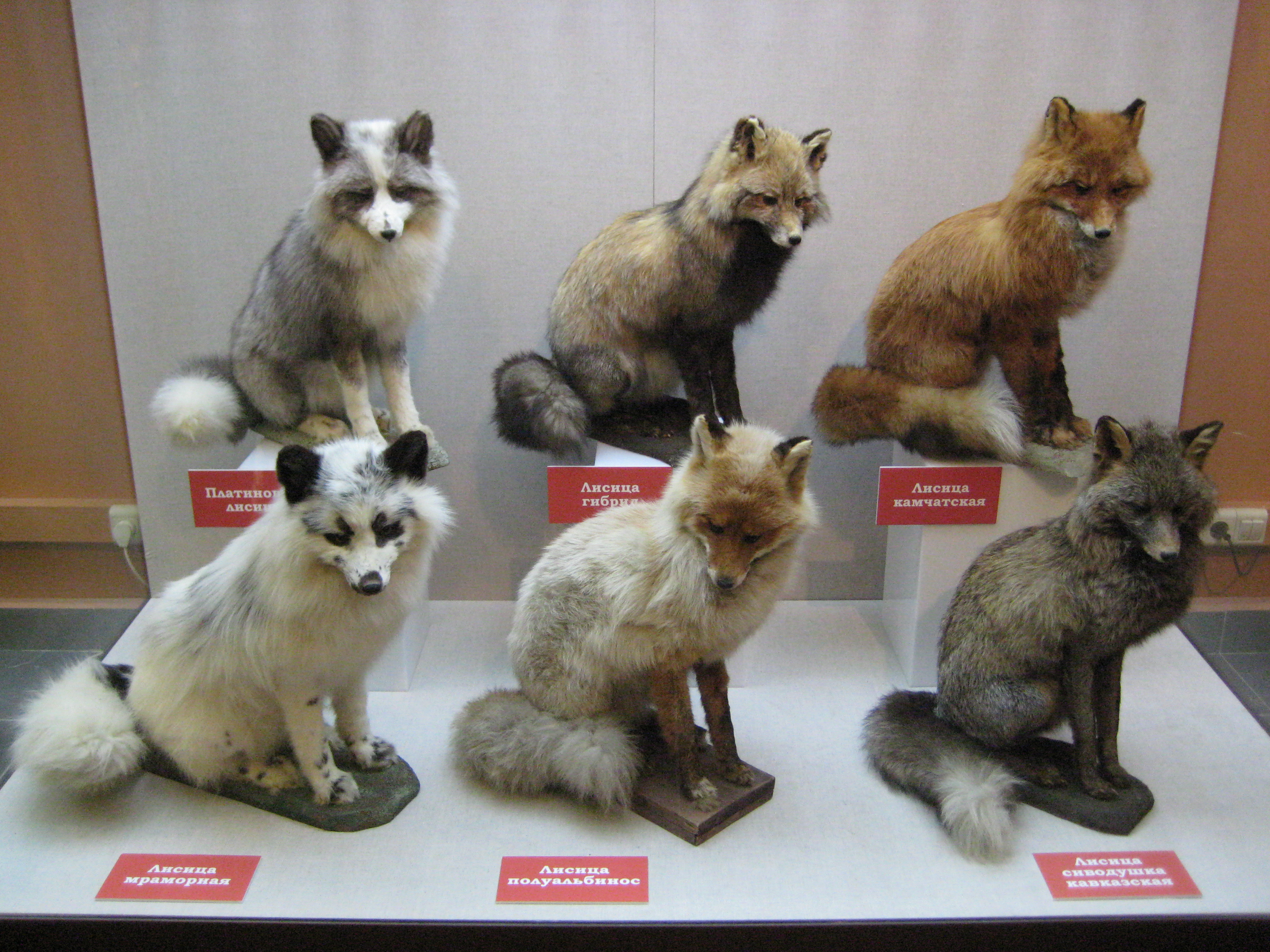
Taxidermy models of various red fox colour morphs

A video of two red fox kits playing in Delaware, U.S.

There are three main colour morphs of the wild red fox: red, silver / black (melanistic) and cross (partially melanistic). Albino red foxes may also occur in the wild, although they are rare. Other colour morphs are extremely rare in the wild, and most of them are known to occur only in domesticated red foxes that are found in fur farms.

Colour morphs of the red fox
Name	Image	Skin	Description
Red			The typical colouration (see Fur above)
Silver			The melanistic colour morph of North American red foxes; individuals of it were introduced into the Old World by the fur trade. Characterised by pure black colour with skin that usually has a variable admixture of silver (covering 25–100% of the skin area).
Platinum			A variant of the silver colour morph that is distinguished from it by its pale, almost silvery-white fur with a bluish cast.
Blackish-brown			The melanistic colour morph of Eurasian red foxes. Characterised by blackish-brown or black fur and skin with a light brownish tint. Both the fur and the skin of this colour morph usually have a variable admixture of silver. Reddish hairs either are completely absent from it or, if they are not, are found in small numbers.
Cross			The lower back and the rump are dark brown or dark grey, with varying degrees of silver on the guard hairs. The cross-shaped markings on the back and shoulders of this colour morph are black or brown, sometimes mixed with light silver. The head and feet are brown.
Smoky			A variant of the cross colour morph in which the spine and the rump is brown or grey with light yellowish bands on the guard hairs. The cross-shaped markings on the back and shoulders of this variant are brown, rusty brown, or reddish-brown. The limbs are brown.
Samson			Distinguished by its woolly pelt, which lacks guard hairs. This colour morph is named after an incident in the life of Samson from chapter 15, verses 4-5 of The Book of Judges in the Old Testament of the Holy Bible.

=== Senses ===
Red foxes have binocular vision, but their sight reacts mainly to movement. They have acute auditory perception, being able to hear black grouse changing roosts at 600 paces, crows flying at 0.25–0.5 km (0.16–0.31 mi) and mice squeaking at about 100 m (330 ft). They can locate sounds with an accuracy of one degree at frequencies of 700–3,000 Hz, though less accurately at higher frequencies. Their sense of smell is good, but weaker than that of dogs specialised in scent work.

=== Scent glands ===
Red foxes have a pair of anal sacs lined with sebaceous glands that open through a single duct. The size and volume of the anal sacs increases with age, ranging in size from 5–40mm in length, 1–3mm in diameter, and with a capacity of 1–5 mL. The anal sacs act as fermentation chambers in which aerobic and anaerobic bacteria convert sebum into odorous compounds, including aliphatic acids. The oval-shaped caudal gland is 25 mm (0.98 in) long and 13 mm (0.51 in) wide, and reportedly smells of violets. The presence of foot glands is equivocal. The interdigital cavities are deep, with a reddish tinge and smell strongly. Sebaceous glands are present on the angle of the jaw and mandible.

== Distribution and habitat ==
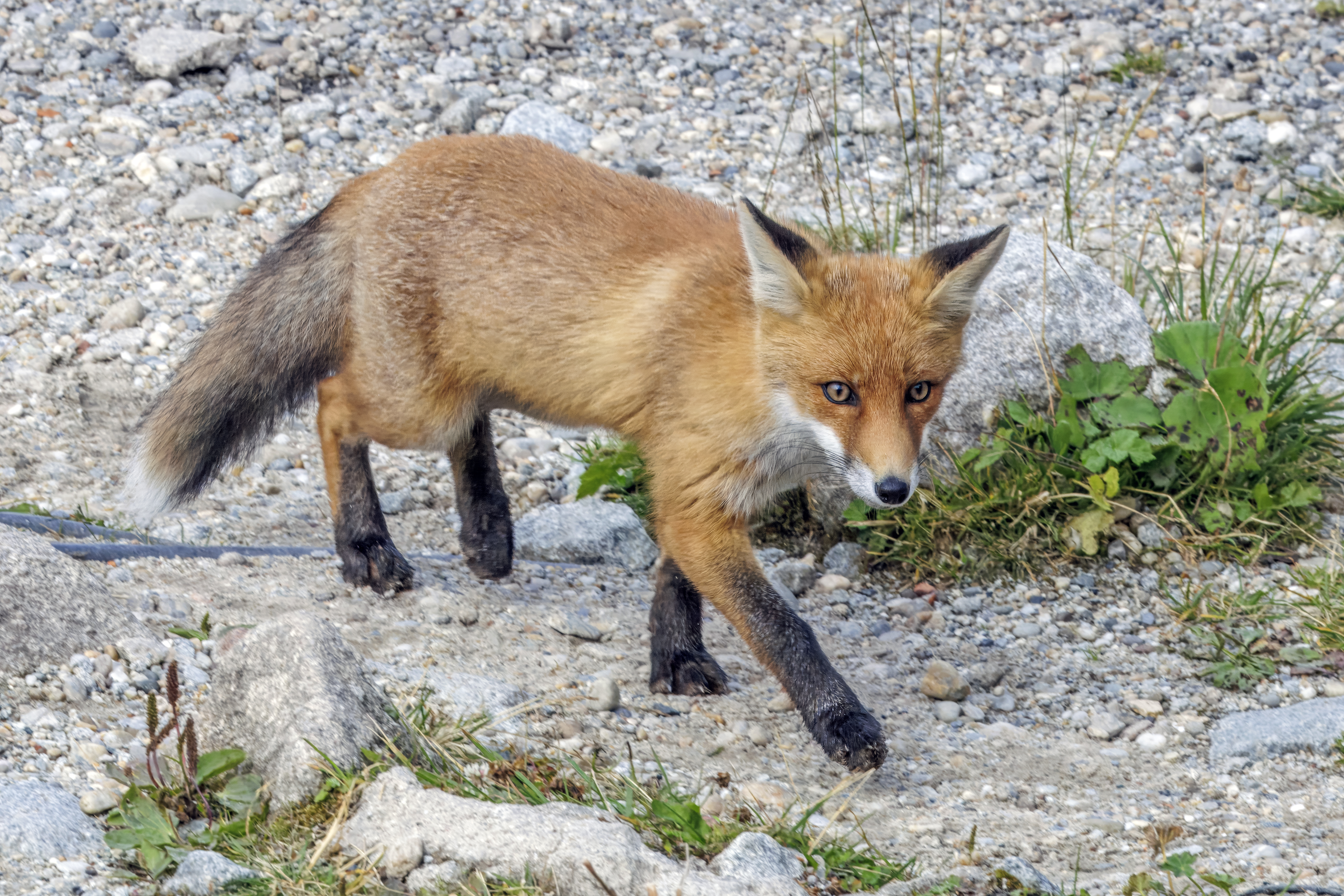
A European fox (V. v. crucigera) in Slovakia

The red fox is the most widespread member of the order Carnivora, and is present on every continent except South America and Antarctica. Its range covers nearly 70,000,000 km^{2} (27,000,000 sq mi), extending as far north as the Arctic Circle. It is found throughout Europe, in Africa north of the Sahara Desert, throughout Asia apart from extreme Southeast Asia, and across North America apart from most of the southwestern United States and Mexico. It is absent from the Arctic islands, the most northerly parts of central Siberia, and in extreme deserts. It is not present in New Zealand and is classed as a "prohibited new organism" under the Hazardous Substances and New Organisms Act of 1996, which does not allow its import.

=== Australia ===
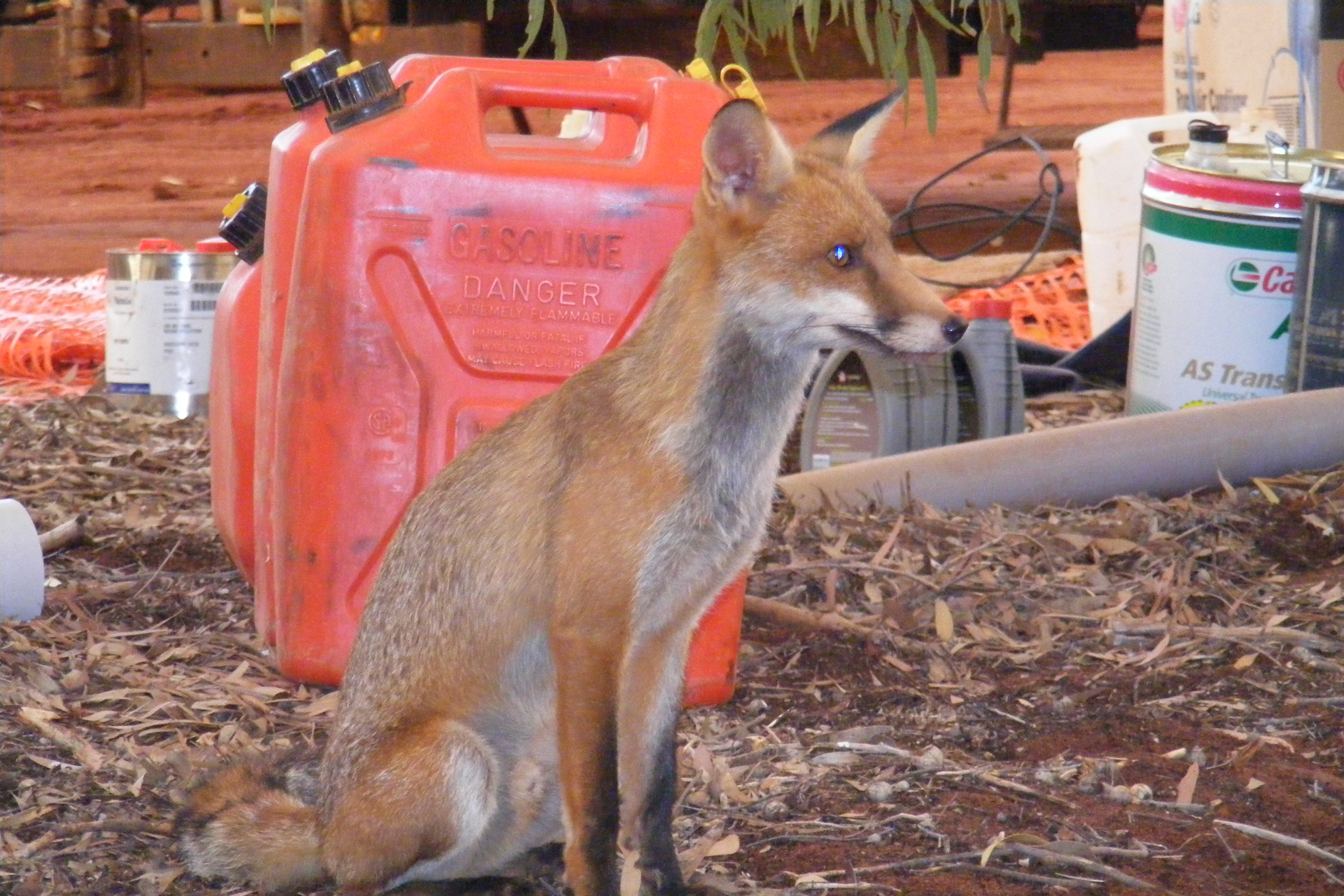
A red fox in Western Australia; red foxes are an invasive species in Australia and can harm native wildlife

In Australia, estimates in 2012 indicated that there were more than 7.2 million red foxes, with a range extending throughout most of the continental mainland. They were introduced Australia in the 1830s and 1840s by settlers in the British colonies of Van Diemen's Land (as early as 1833) and the Port Phillip District of New South Wales (as early as 1845). The settlers wanted to foster the traditional English sport of fox hunting. However, a permanent red fox population did not become established on the island of Tasmania, and it is widely believed that foxes were outcompeted by the Tasmanian devil. On the mainland, however, the species was successful as an apex predator. The red fox is generally less common in areas where the dingo is more prevalent, but it has achieved niche differentiation with both the feral dog and the feral cat, primarily through its burrowing behaviour. Consequently, the red fox has become one of the continent's most destructive invasive species, and it is included in the IUCN's list of 100 of the World's Worst Invasive Alien Species.

The red fox has been implicated in the extinction or decline of several native Australian species, particularly those of the family Potoroidae, including the desert rat-kangaroo. The spread of red foxes across the southern part of the continent has coincided with the spread of rabbits in Australia, and corresponds with declines in the distribution of several medium-sized ground-dwelling mammals, including brush-tailed bettongs, burrowing bettongs, rufous bettongs, bilbies, numbats, bridled nail-tail wallabies and quokkas. Most of those species are now limited to areas (such as islands) where red foxes are absent or rare. Local red fox eradication programs exist, although elimination has proven difficult due to the red fox's denning behaviour and nocturnal hunting, so the focus is on management, including the introduction of state bounties. According to the Tasmanian government, red foxes were accidentally introduced to the previously fox-free island of Tasmania in 1999 or 2000, posing a significant threat to native wildlife, including the eastern bettong, and an eradication program was initiated, conducted by the Tasmanian Department of Primary Industries and Water.

=== Sardinia ===
The origin of the subspecies V. v. ichnusae found in Sardinia, Italy is uncertain, as it is absent from Pleistocene deposits in their current homeland. It is possible it originated during the Neolithic following its introduction to the island by humans. It is likely then that Sardinian fox populations stem from repeated introductions of animals from different localities in the Mediterranean. This latter theory may explain the subspecies' phenotypic diversity.

== Behaviour and ecology ==
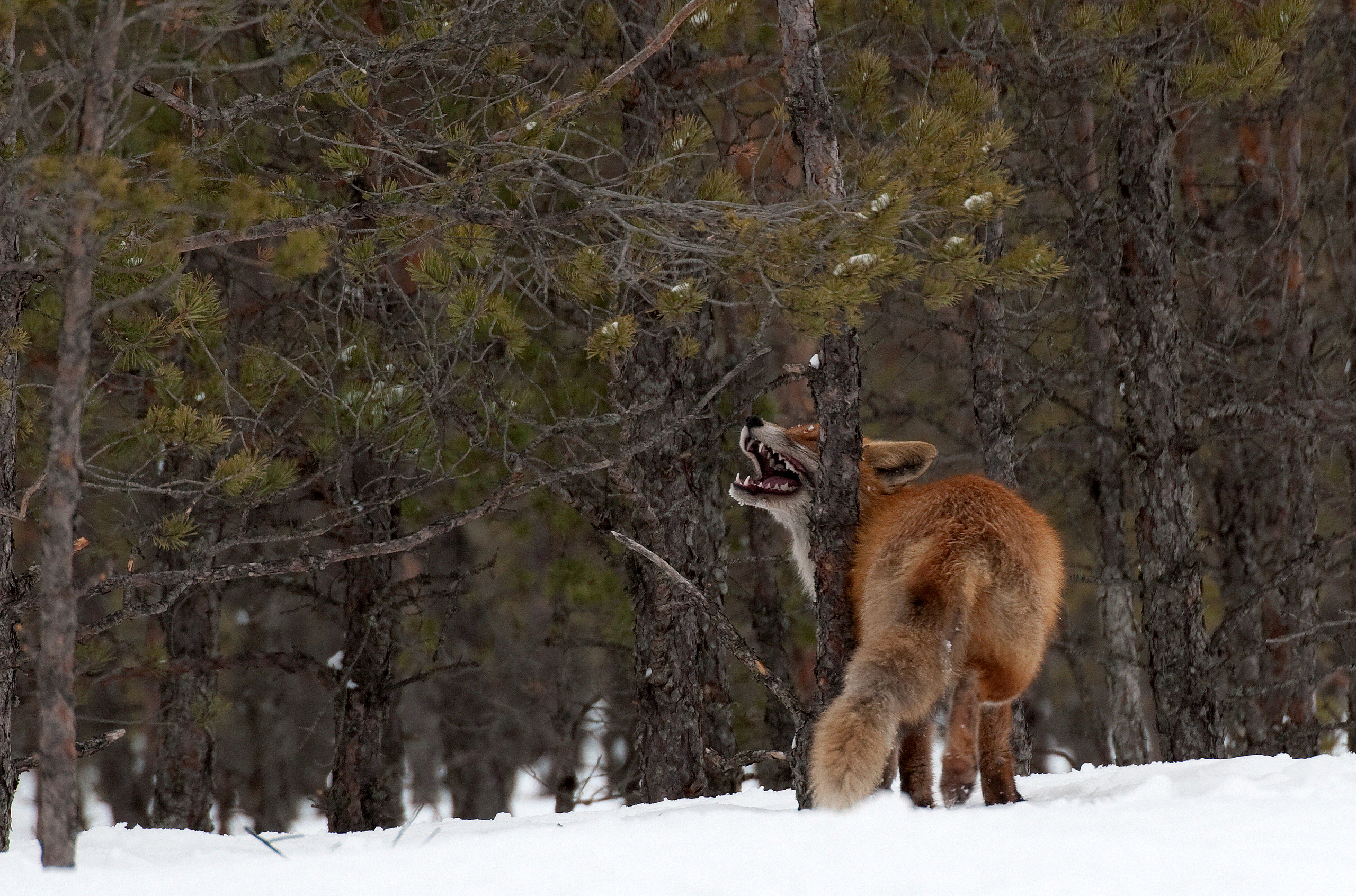
A red fox pressing against the trunk of a tree in Ilmatsalu, Estonia

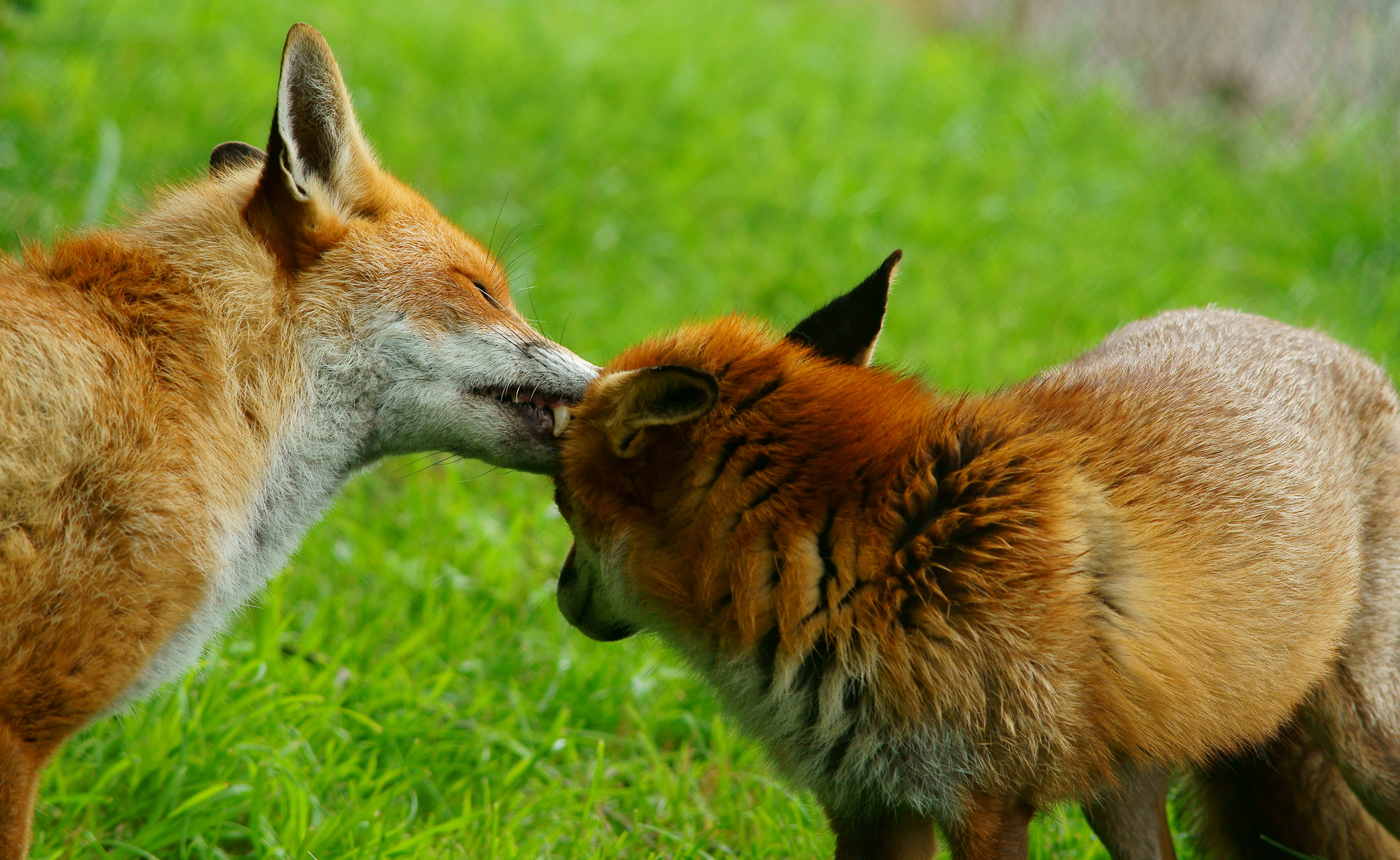
Two red foxes grooming each other

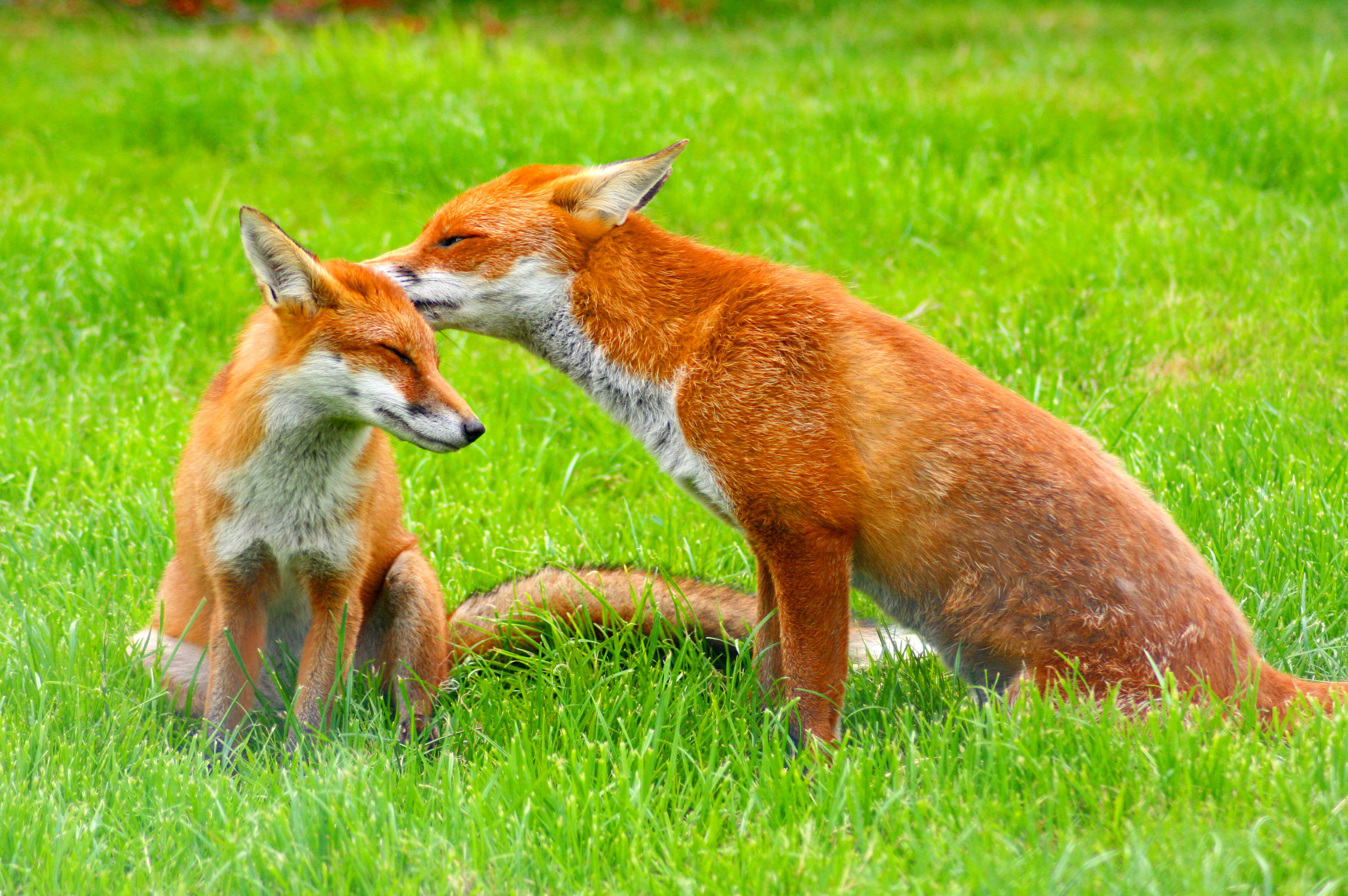
Two European foxes (V. v. crucigera) at the British Wildlife Centre, Surrey, England

=== Social and territorial behaviour ===
Red foxes either establish stable home ranges within particular areas or are itinerant with no fixed abode. They use their urine to mark their territories. A dog raises one of his hind legs, spraying his urine forward in front of him. In contrast, a vixen squats down, spraying her urine onto the ground between her hind legs. Urine is also used to mark empty cache sites where found food is stored. This serves as a reminder not to waste time investigating them. Dogs generally have higher urine marking rates during late summer and autumn, but the rest of the year the rates between dog and vixen are similar. The use of up to 12 different urination postures allows them to precisely control the position of the scent mark.

Red foxes live in family groups that share a territory. In favourable habitats and/or areas with low hunting pressure, a range of subordinate foxes may be present. There may be one or two subordinate foxes, or sometimes up to eight, in one territory. These subordinates may formerly have been dominant animals, but they are mostly young from the previous year and act as helpers in rearing the breeding vixen's kits. Alternatively, their presence has been explained as a response to temporary food surpluses unrelated to assisting reproductive success. Non-breeding vixens guard, play with, groom, provision and retrieve kits, an example of kin selection. Red foxes may leave their families once they reach adulthood if they have a high chance of winning a family of their own. Otherwise, they will stay with their parents, postponing their own reproduction in the process.

=== Reproduction and development ===
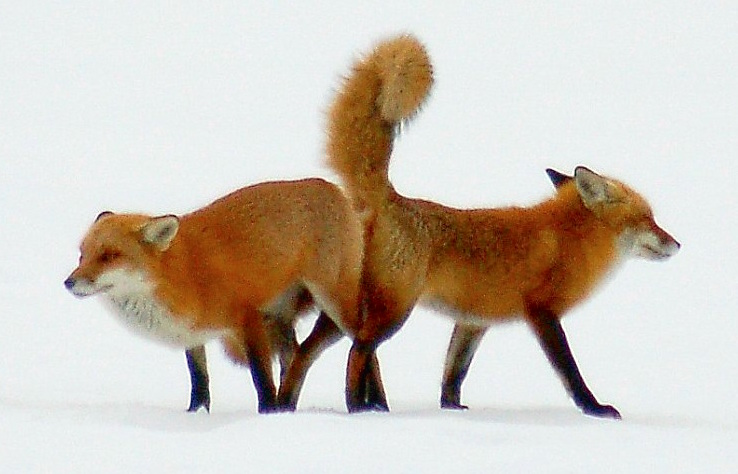
Two red foxes mating

Young red foxes play fighting

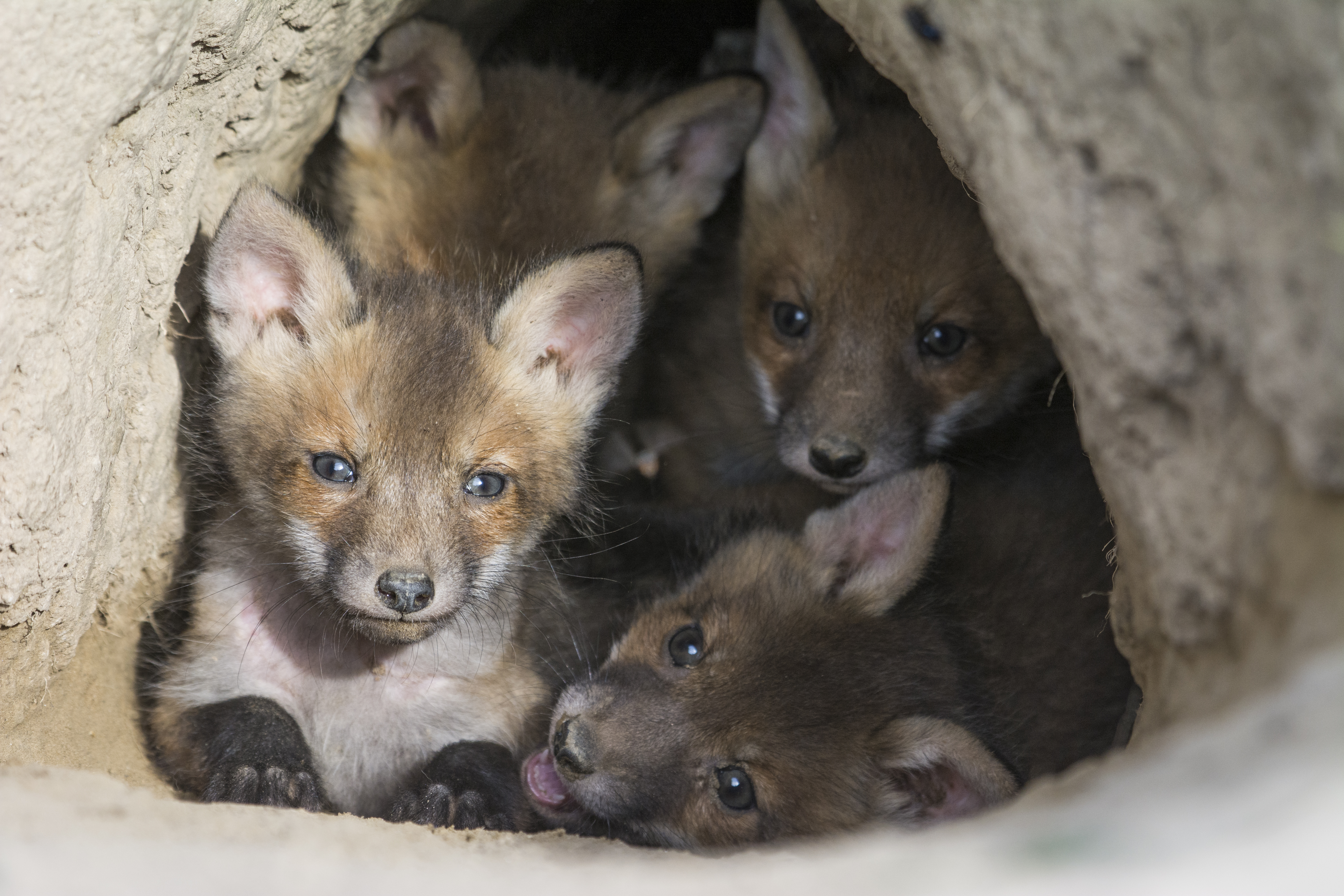
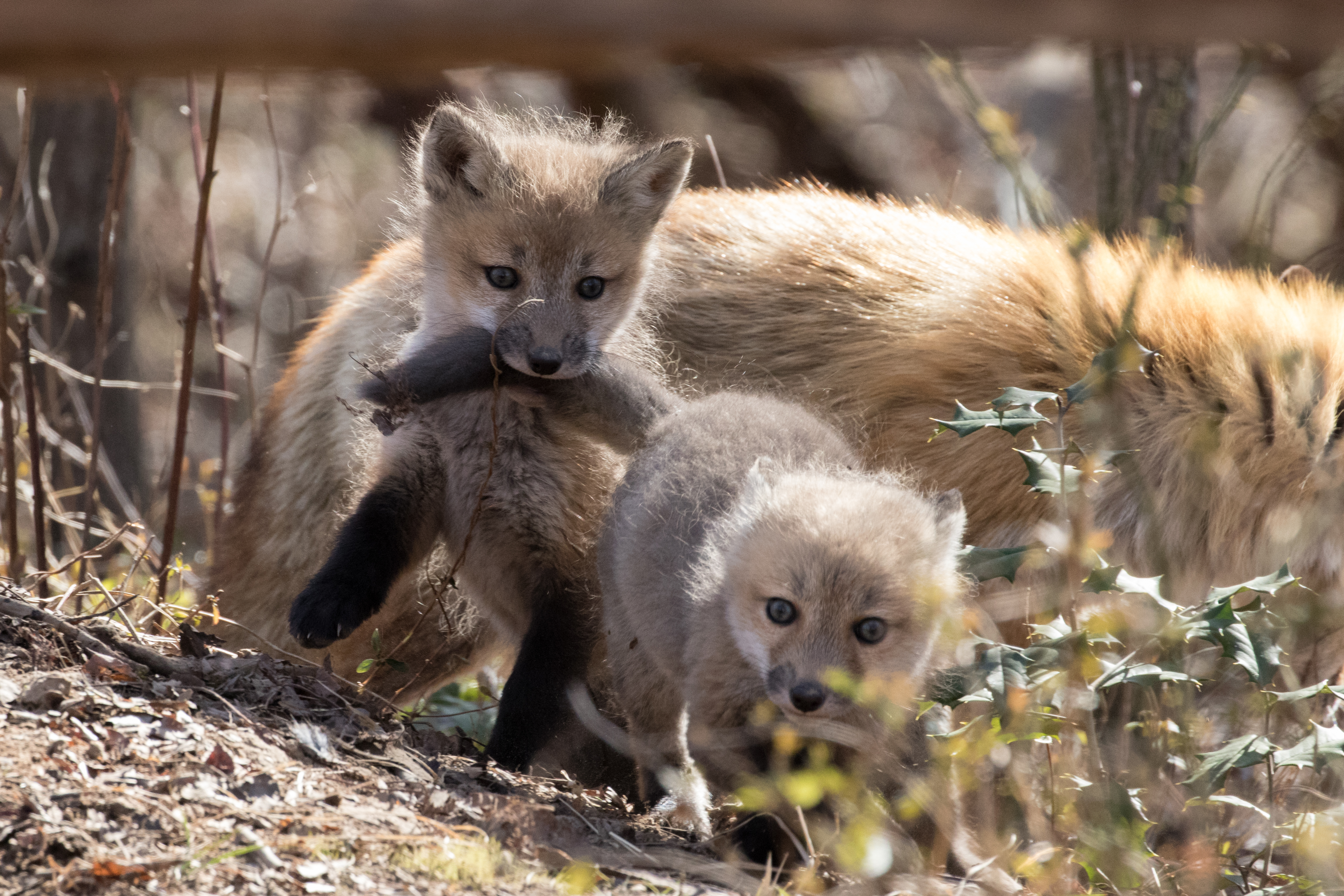
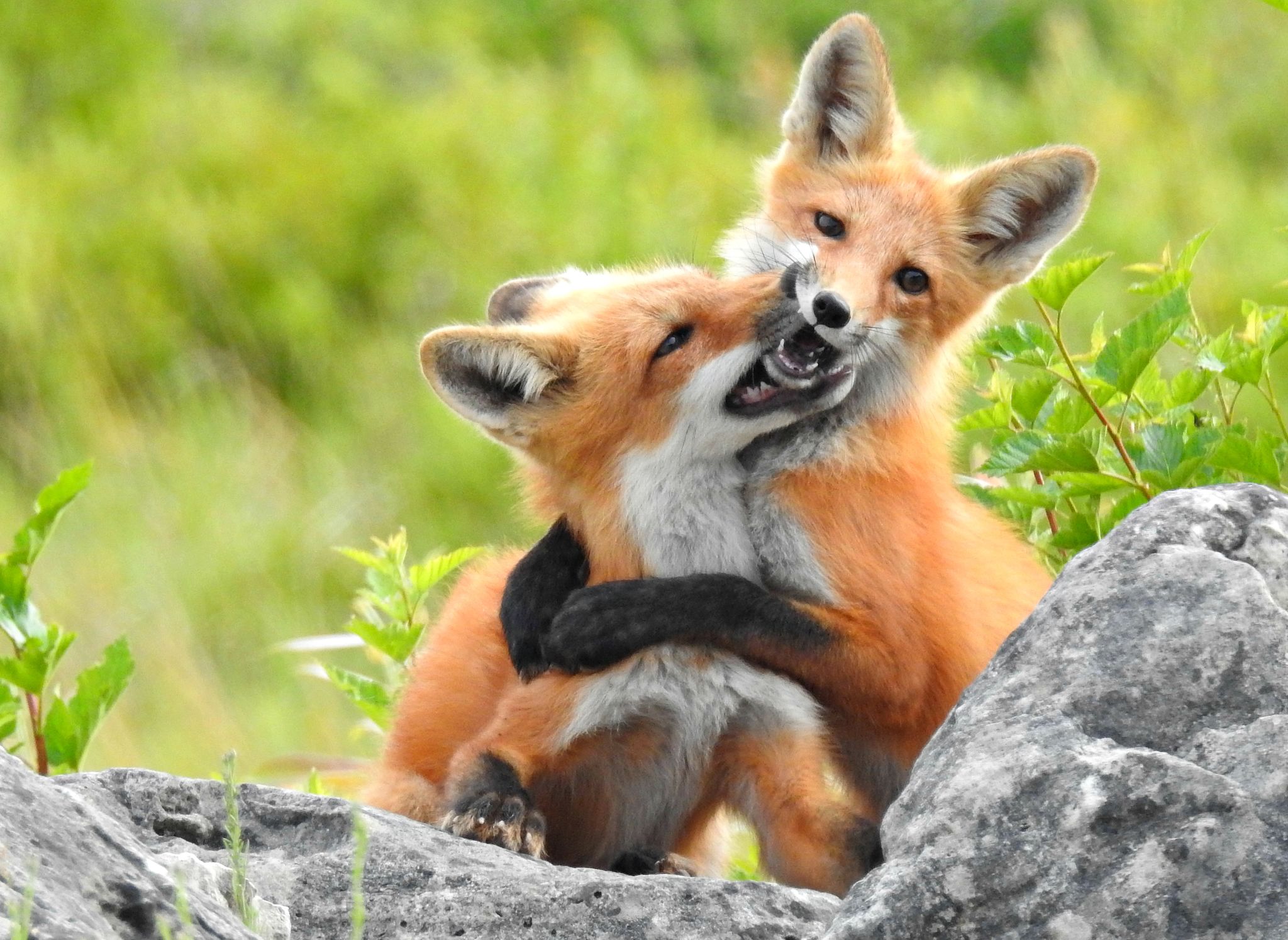
Developmental stages: in the den; emerging from the den; adolescent

Red foxes reproduce once a year in spring. Two months prior to oestrus (typically December), the reproductive organs of vixens change shape and size. By the time they enter their oestrus period, their uterine horns double in size, and their ovaries grow 1.5–2 times larger. Sperm formation in dogs begins in August–September, with the testes attaining their greatest weight in December–February. The vixen's oestrus period lasts three weeks, during which dogs mate with several vixens for several days, often in burrows. The dog's bulbus glandis enlarges during copulation, forming a copulatory tie which may last for more than one hour. The gestation period lasts 49–58 days. Though foxes are largely monogamous, DNA evidence from one population indicated large levels of polygyny, incest and mixed paternity litters. Subordinate vixens may become pregnant, but usually fail to whelp, or have their kits killed post-partum by either the dominant vixen or other subordinate vixens.

The average litter size consists of four to six kits, though litters of up to 13 kits have been reported. Large litters are typical in areas where red fox mortality is high. Kits are born blind, deaf and toothless, with dark brown fluffy fur. At birth, they weigh 56–110 g (2.0–3.9 oz) and measure 14.5 cm (5.7 in) in body length and 7.5 cm (3.0 in) in tail length. At birth, they are short-legged, large-headed and have broad chests. The mothers remain with the kits for 2–3 weeks as they are unable to thermoregulate. During this period, the fathers or barren vixens feed the mothers. Vixens are protective of their kits, and have been known to even fight off terriers in their defence. If the mother dies before the kits are independent, the father takes over as their provider. The kits' eyes open after 13–15 days, during which time their ear canals open and their upper teeth erupt, with the lower teeth emerging 3–4 days later. Their eyes are blue at birth, but change to amber at 4–5 weeks. Their coat begins to change colour at three weeks of age, when a black streak appears around the eyes. By one month of age, red and white patches appear on their faces. During this time, their ears become erect and their muzzles elongate. Kits begin to leave their dens and experiment with solid food provided by their parents at the age of 3–4 weeks. The lactation period lasts 6–7 weeks. Their woolly coats begin to be coated by shiny guard hairs after 8 weeks. By the age of 3–4 months, the kits are long-legged, narrow-chested and sinewy. They reach adult proportions at the age of 6–7 months. Some vixens may reach sexual maturity at the age of 9–10 months, thus bearing their first litters at 1 year old. In captivity, their longevity can be as long as 15 years, though in the wild they typically do not survive past 5 years.

=== Denning behaviour ===
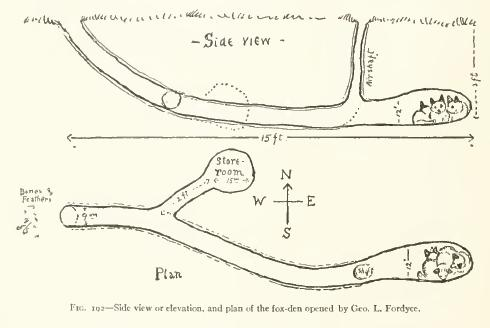
Illustration of the side and above views of a red fox den

A video of red fox kits coming out of their den

Outside of the breeding season, most red foxes prefer to live in the open, in densely vegetated areas, although they may enter burrows to escape bad weather. Their burrows are often dug on hill or mountain slopes, in ravines and on steep riverbanks, as well as in ditches, depressions and gutters, and in rock clefts and neglected human environments. Red foxes prefer to dig their burrows in well-drained soil. Dens built among tree roots can last for decades, whereas those dug in steppe regions only last several years. They may permanently abandon their dens during mange outbreaks, possibly as a defence mechanism against the spread of this particular disease. In the Eurasian desert regions, red foxes may use the burrows of wolves, porcupines and other large mammals, as well as those dug by gerbil colonies. Compared to burrows constructed by Arctic foxes, corsac foxes, badgers, and marmots, red fox dens are not overly complex. Red fox burrows consist of a den and temporary burrows. The latter comprise of either a small passage or a cave for concealment. The main entrance of the burrow leads downwards (40–45°) and opens into a den, from which numerous side tunnels branch off. The depth of the burrow ranges from 0.5–2.5 m (1 ft 8 in – 8 ft 2 in), rarely extending to groundwater. The main passage can reach 17 m (56 ft) in length, standing an average of 5–7 m (16–23 ft). In spring, red foxes clear their dens of excess soil by making rapid movements with their forepaws and hind legs. They throw the discarded soil up to 2 m (6 ft 7 in) from the burrow. Once the kits are born, the discarded debris is trampled to form an area where the kits can play and receive food. They may share their dens with woodchucks or badgers. Unlike badgers, which fastidiously clean their earths and defecate in latrines, red foxes habitually leave pieces of prey around their dens. The average sleep time of a captive red fox is 9.8 hours per day.

=== Communication ===
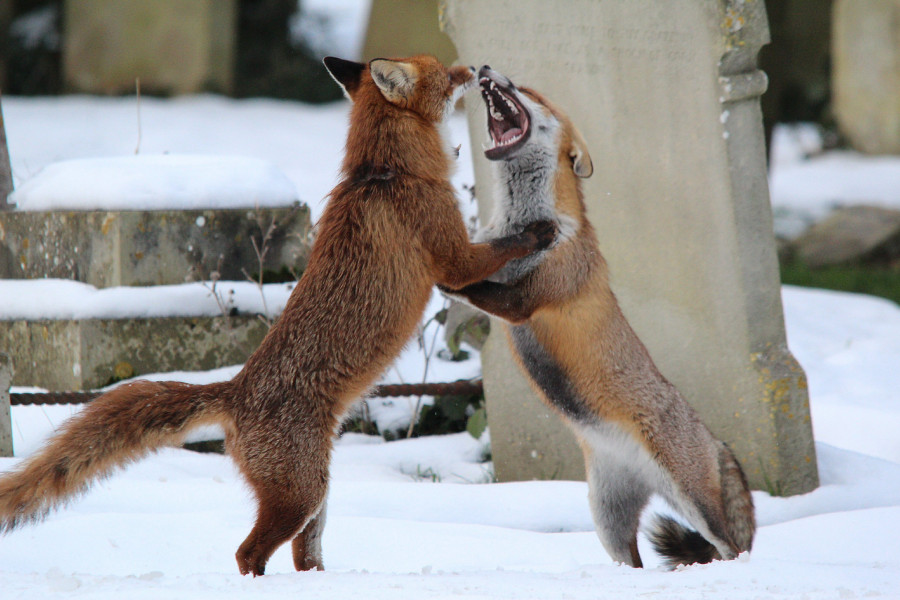
Two red foxes fighting in the characteristic "fox trot" pose

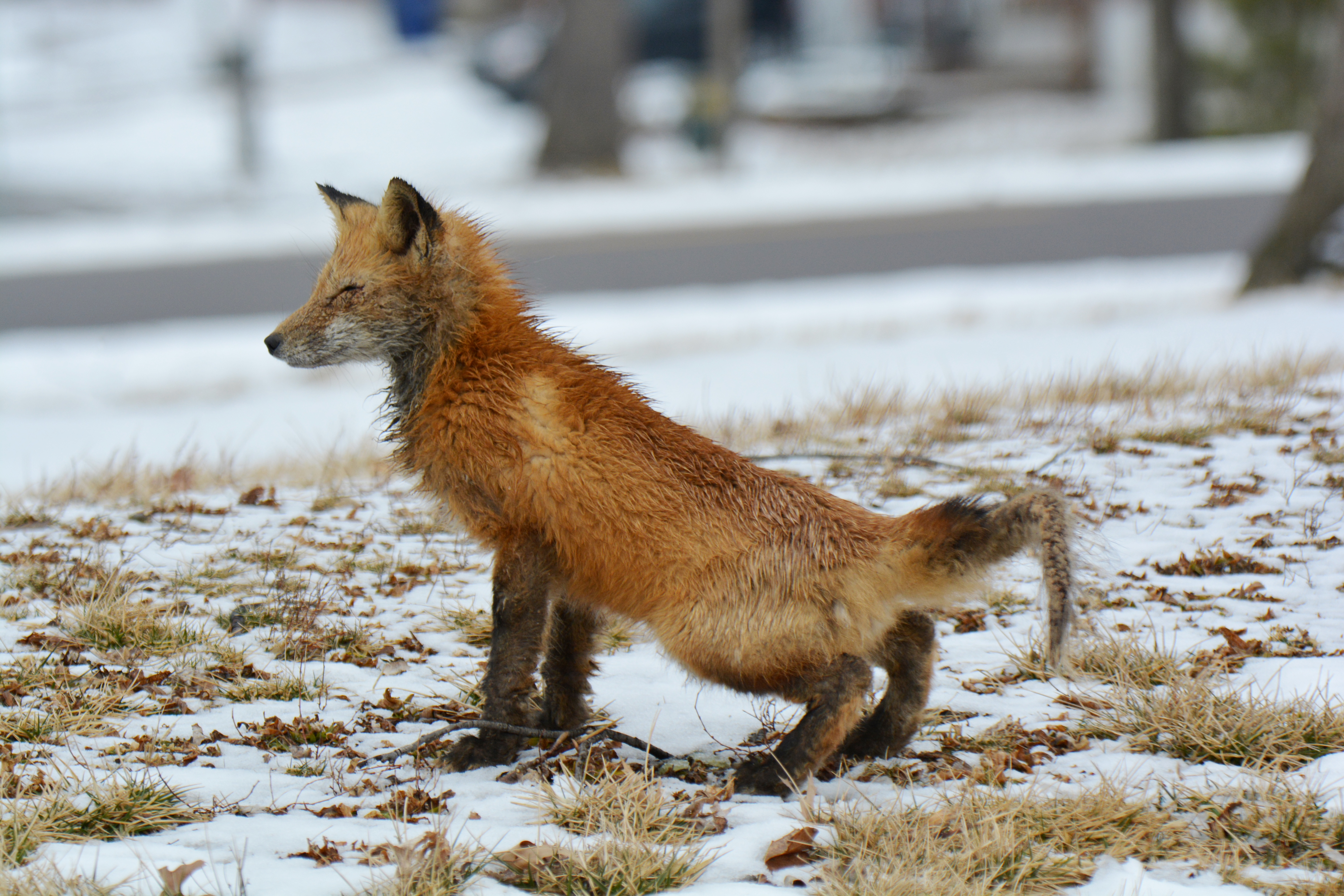
A red fox marking its territory

The body language of red foxes consists of movements of the ears and tail, as well as postures. Their body markings emphasise certain gestures. These postures can be categorised as either aggressive / dominant or fearful / submissive. Some postures may blend the two together. Inquisitive red foxes will rotate and flick their ears while they sniff. Playful ones will perk their ears up and stand on their hind legs. Dogs will turn their ears outward and raise their tails horizontally with the tips raised upwards when courting vixens or after successfully evicting intruders. When afraid, red foxes grin in submission, arching their backs, curving their bodies, crouching their legs and lashing their tails back and forth with their ears pointing backwards and pressed against their skulls. When merely expressing submission to a dominant red fox, they adopt a similar posture, but without arching their backs or curving their bodies. Submissive red foxes approach dominant ones with their muzzles reaching up in greeting, in a low posture. When two evenly matched red foxes confront each other over food, they approach side by side and push against each other's flanks. They betray a mixture of fear and aggression through their actions: they lash their tails and arch their backs, but do not crouch or pull their ears back and flatten them against their skulls. When launching an assertive attack, red foxes approach directly, with their tails held high and their ears rotated sideways. During such fights, red foxes will stand on each other's upper bodies with their forelegs, using open mouthed threats. Such fights typically only occur among juveniles or adults of the same sex.

A red fox's barks, recorded in Gloucestershire, England, January 1977

Red foxes have a wide vocal range, and produce different sounds spanning five octaves which blend into each other. Recent analyses have identified 12 different sounds produced by adults and eight by kits. The majority of sounds can be categorised as either "contact" or "interaction" calls. The former vary according to the distance between individuals, while the latter vary according to the level of aggression.

- Contact calls: The most commonly heard contact call is a barking sound consisting of three to five syllables, transcribed as "wow wow wow", which is often made by two red foxes approaching one another. This call is most frequently heard from December to February (when they can be confused with the territorial calls of tawny owls). The "wow wow wow" call varies from one red fox to another. Captive red foxes have been recorded to answer pre-recorded calls of their pen-mates, but not those of strangers. Kits begin emitting the "wow wow wow" call at the age of 19 days old when craving attention. When red foxes draw close together, they emit trisyllabic greeting warbles similar to the clucking of chickens. Adults greet their kits with gruff huffing noises.
- Interaction calls: When greeting one another, red foxes emit high pitched whines, particularly submissive individuals. A submissive red fox when approached by a dominant one will emit a ululating siren-like shriek. During aggressive encounters with conspecifics, they emit a throaty rattling sound, similar to a ratchet, called "gekkering". Gekkering occurs mostly during the courting season from rival dogs or vixens rejecting advances from dogs.

Another call that does not fit into the two categories is a long, drawn-out, monosyllabic "waaaaah" sound. As it is commonly heard during the breeding season, it is thought to be emitted by vixens summoning dogs. When danger is detected, red foxes emit a monosyllabic bark. At close quarters, it is a muffled cough, while at long distances it is sharper. Kits make warbling whimpers when nursing, these calls being especially loud when they are dissatisfied. Red fox calls may sound like a person screaming.

=== Diet and hunting behaviour ===
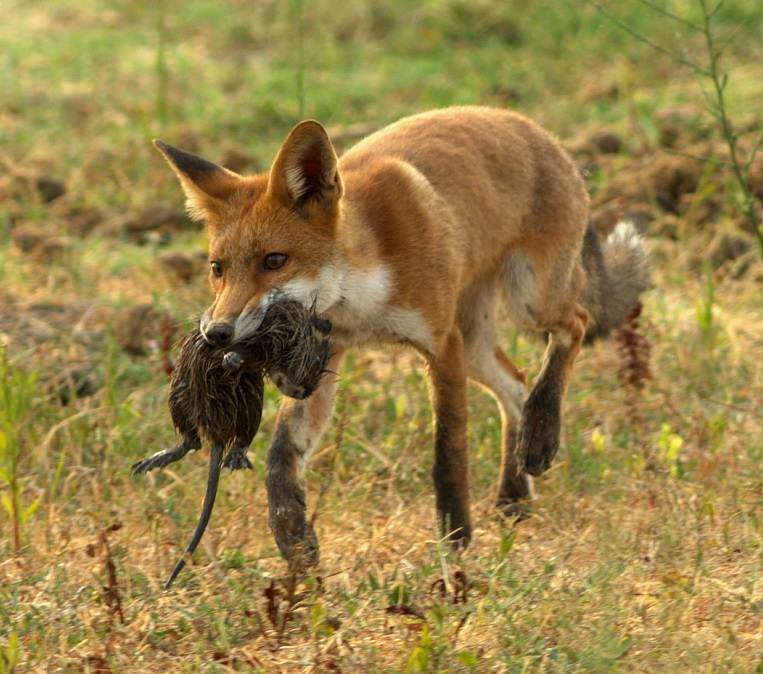
A red fox with a coypu

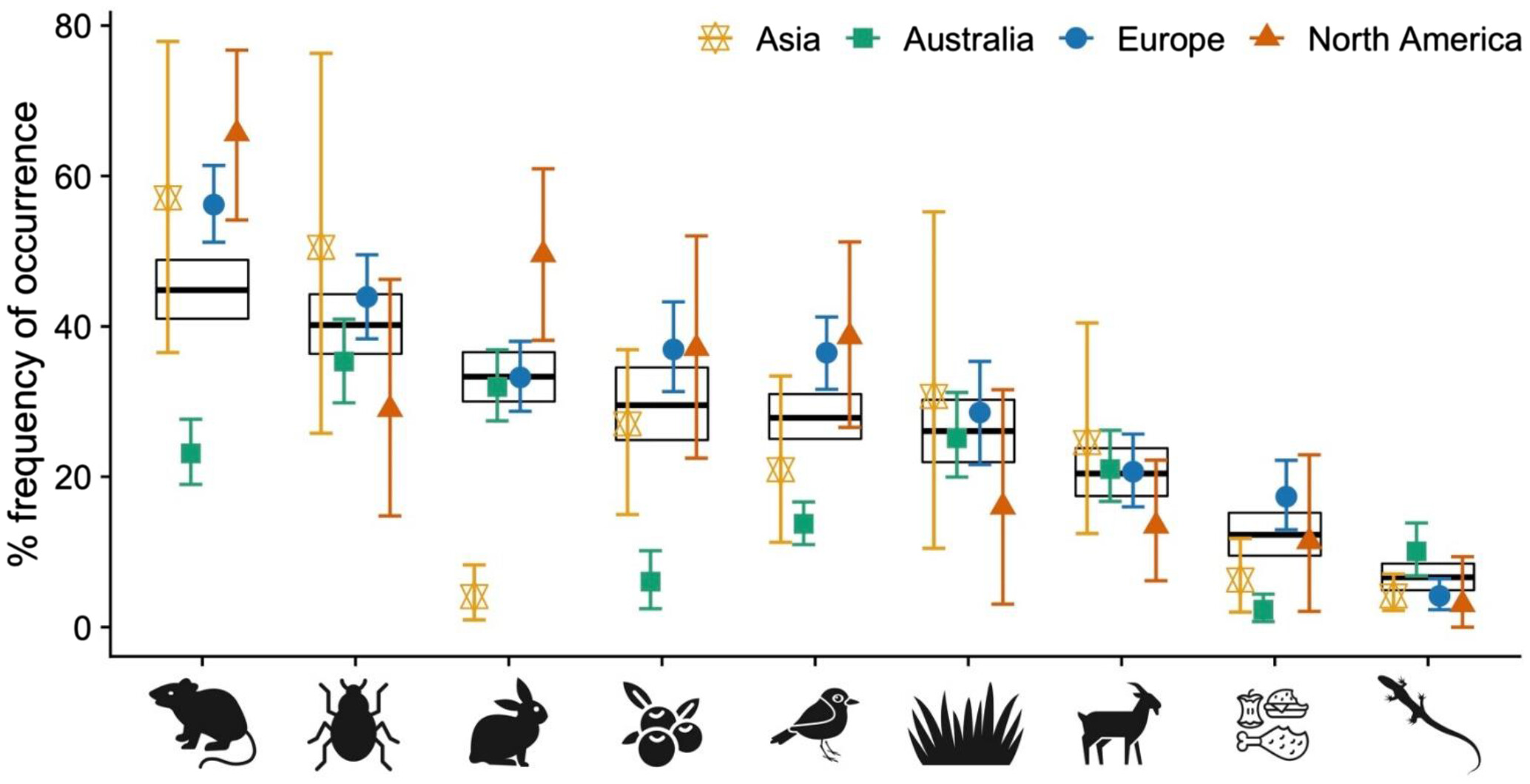
Occurrence of key food categories in the diet of red foxes by continent (food categories from left to right: small mammals, invertebrates, medium-sized mammals, fruit, birds, vegetation, large mammals, garbage, and reptiles)

The red fox is an omnivore with a highly varied diet. It consumes over 300 animal species including small rodents like mice, ground squirrels, hamsters, gerbils, woodchucks, muskrats, voles, pocket gophers, deer mice, leporids, porcupines, raccoons, opossums, birds with Passeriformes, Galliformes and waterfowl predominating, reptiles, insects and invertebrates. In Doñana National Park, the European rabbit (Oryctolagus cuniculus) is a major prey item. It attacks young or small ungulates on rare occasions. In southern Italy, red foxes were observed eating pond slider eggs excavated from nests. Camera traps at an Australian rookery documented red foxes preying on flatback sea turtle eggs. The behavior of red foxes hunting wolf cubs was documented in Italy in 2025.

The red fox typically targets mammals with a weight of up to 3.5 kg (7.7 lb) and requires 500 g (18 oz) of food daily. It hunts its preferred prey when it is abundant, but it can still survive on different prey, as well as seeds and fruit, when it is not available. It occasionally commits acts of surplus killing; during one breeding season, four red foxes were recorded to have killed around 200 black-headed gulls each, with peaks during dark, windy hours when flying conditions were unfavourable. Losses to poultry and penned game birds can be substantial because of this. In some areas, fruit amounts to 100% of its diet in autumn, including blueberry, blackberry, raspberry, cherry, persimmon, mulberry, apple, plum, grape and acorn. Other plant material includes grass, sedge and tuber.

Visual cues are the most important ones for the hunting behaviour of the red fox. It prefers to hunt in the early morning hours before sunrise and late evening. Successful hunting in long vegetation or under snow appears to involve its alignment with Earth's magnetic field. It typically forages alone, but occasionally aggregates in resource-rich environments. When hunting mouse-like prey, it first pinpoints the prey's location by sound, then leaps upward, sailing high above the quarry, steering in mid-air with its tail before landing on target up to 5 m (16 ft) away. It feeds on carrion in the late evening hours and at night. It seems to dislike the taste of moles, but nonetheless catches them alive and presents them to its young so that they can play with them. It is possessive of its food and defends its catches even from dominant animals.

=== Competitors ===
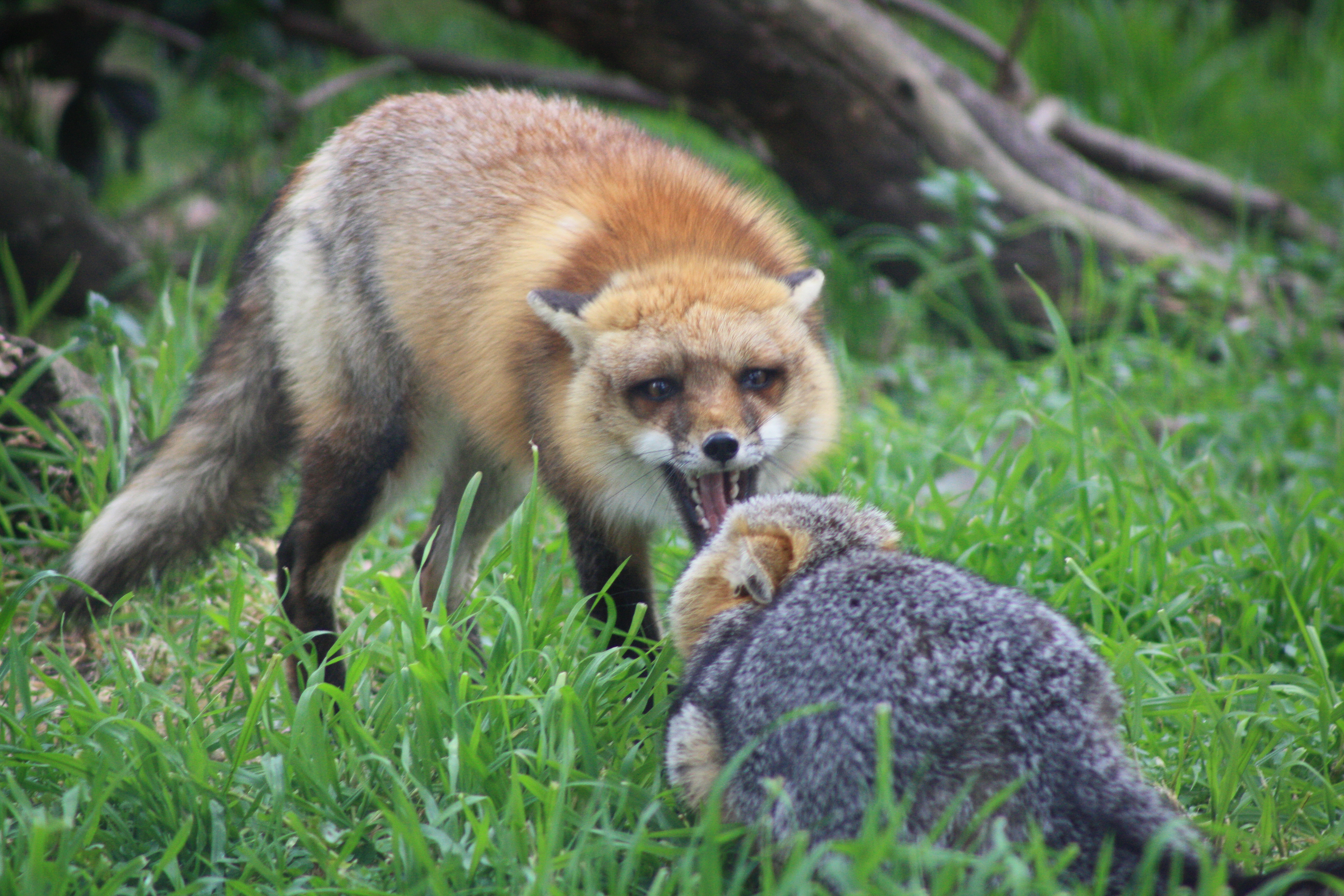
A red fox confronting a gray fox

The red fox typically dominates other fox species. Where the red fox and the Arctic fox are sympatric, the Arctic fox feeds on lemmings and flotsam rather than voles, which are favoured by red foxes. Both species will kill each other's kits if given the opportunity. The southern range of the Arctic fox is limited by the presence of the red fox; both were introduced to almost every island from the Aleutian Islands to the Alexander Archipelago during the 1830s to the 1930s by fur companies. The red fox invariably displaced the Arctic fox, with one male red fox having been reported to have single-handedly killed off all of the resident Arctic foxes from a small island in 1866.

The red fox is a competitor of the corsac fox, as they hunt the same prey all year. The red fox is stronger, better adapted to hunting in snow deeper than 10 cm (3.9 in) and is more effective in hunting and catching medium-sized to large rodents. The corsac fox seems to only outcompete the red fox in semi-desert and steppe areas. In Israel, Blanford's fox escapes competition with the red fox by being restricted to rocky cliffs and actively avoiding the open plains inhabited by the red fox. The red fox dominates both kit and swift foxes. Kit foxes usually avoid competition with their larger cousins by living in more arid environments, though red foxes have been increasing in ranges formerly occupied by kit foxes due to human-induced environmental changes. Red foxes will kill both species and compete with them for food and den sites. The gray fox dominates the red fox wherever their ranges meet. Historically, interactions between the two species were rare, as the gray fox favoured heavily wooded or semiarid habitats as opposed to the open and mesic ones preferred by the red fox. However, interactions have become more frequent due to deforestation, allowing the red fox to colonise gray fox-inhabited areas.

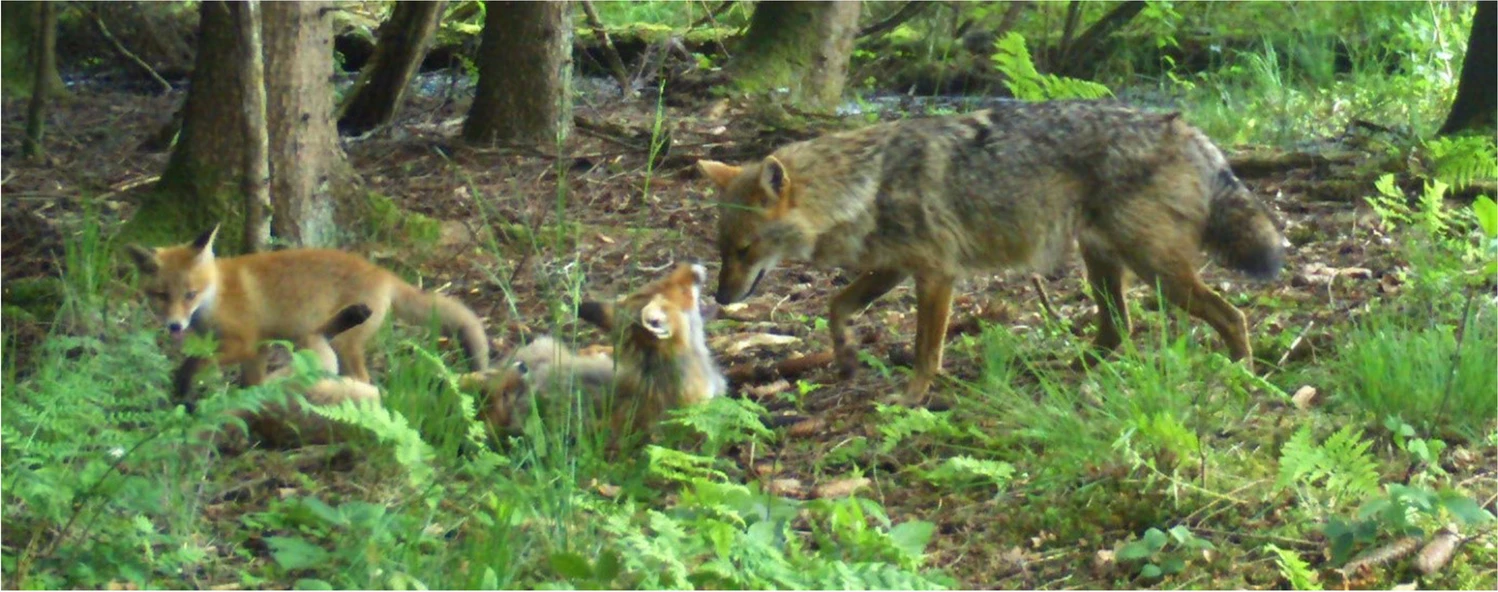
A vixen and her kits interacting peacefully with a male golden jackal in southwestern Germany

The wolf is known to kill and eat the red fox in disputes over carcasses. In North America where the red fox and the coyote are sympatric, their home ranges do not overlap, and interactions between the two species vary in nature, ranging from active antagonism to indifference. The majority of aggressive encounters are initiated by coyotes, and there are few reports of red foxes acting aggressively toward coyotes except when attacked or when their kits were approached. Foxes and coyotes have sometimes been seen feeding together. In Israel, the red fox shares habitat with the golden jackal, and where their ranges meet, they compete due to near-identical diets. The red fox ignores golden jackal scents or tracks and avoids close physical proximity; in areas where the golden jackal is abundant, the red fox population decreases significantly, apparently because of competitive exclusion. However, multiple red foxes interacting peacefully with a golden jackal have been observed in southwestern Germany.

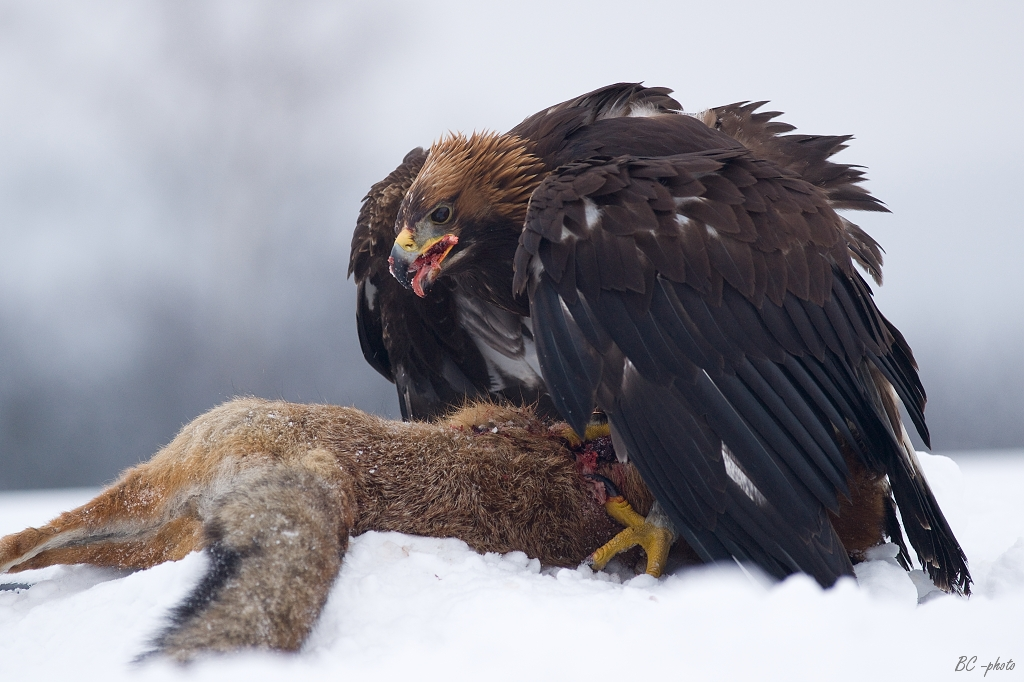
A golden eagle feeding on a red fox

The red fox is dominant over the common raccoon dog and will sometimes kill its kits or bite adults to death. There are documented cases of red foxes killing common raccoon dogs by entering their dens. Both species compete for prey similar in size to mice. This competition peaks in early spring when food is scarce. In Tatarstan, red fox predation accounted for 11.1% of deaths among 54 common raccoon dogs and amounted to 14.3% of 186 common raccoon dog deaths in northwestern Russia.

The red fox occasionally kills small mustelids like the stoat, the least weasel, the Siberian weasel, the European polecat, the European pine marten, the beech marten, and young sables. European badgers may live alongside red foxes in isolated sections of large burrows. The two species may tolerate each other out of mutualism: red foxes provide European badgers with food scraps, while European badgers keep the shared burrow clean. However, there are known cases of European badgers driving vixens from their dens and destroying their litters without eating them. Wolverines may kill red foxes, often while the latter is sleeping or near carrion. In turn, red foxes may kill young wolverines.

The red fox competes with the striped hyena over large carcasses. The striped hyena's stronger jaws can easily tear open flesh that is too tough for the red fox. When harassing striped hyenas, it avoids attacks by outrunning them. Sometimes, red foxes seem to deliberately torment striped hyenas even when food is not at stake. However, some red foxes misjudge their attacks and are killed. The remains of red foxes are often found in striped hyena dens, and striped hyenas steal red foxes from traps.

In Europe, Asia and North Africa, the red fox is preyed upon by the Eurasian lynx, the leopard, and the caracal. The Eurasian lynx chases the red fox into deep snow, where its long legs and larger paws gives it an advantage over the red fox, especially when the depth of the snow exceeds one metre. In the Velikoluksky District in Russia, the red fox is absent or seen only occasionally where the Eurasian lynx has established permanent territories. In North America, the red fox is preyed upon by the cougar, the Canada lynx, and the bobcat.

The red fox competes with the common buzzard (Buteo buteo) and the Eurasian goshawk (Astur gentilis) and even steals their kills. The golden eagle (Aquila chrysaetos) regularly takes young red foxes and preys on adults if needed. Other large eagles such as the wedge-tailed eagle (Aquila audax), the eastern imperial eagle (Aquila heliaca), the white-tailed eagle (Haliaeetus albicilla) and Steller's sea eagle (Haliaeetus pelagicus) occasionally kill red foxes. Large owls such as the Eurasian eagle-owl (Bubo bubo) and the snowy owl (Bubo scandiacus) prey on young and adult red foxes on occasion.

=== Diseases and parasites ===
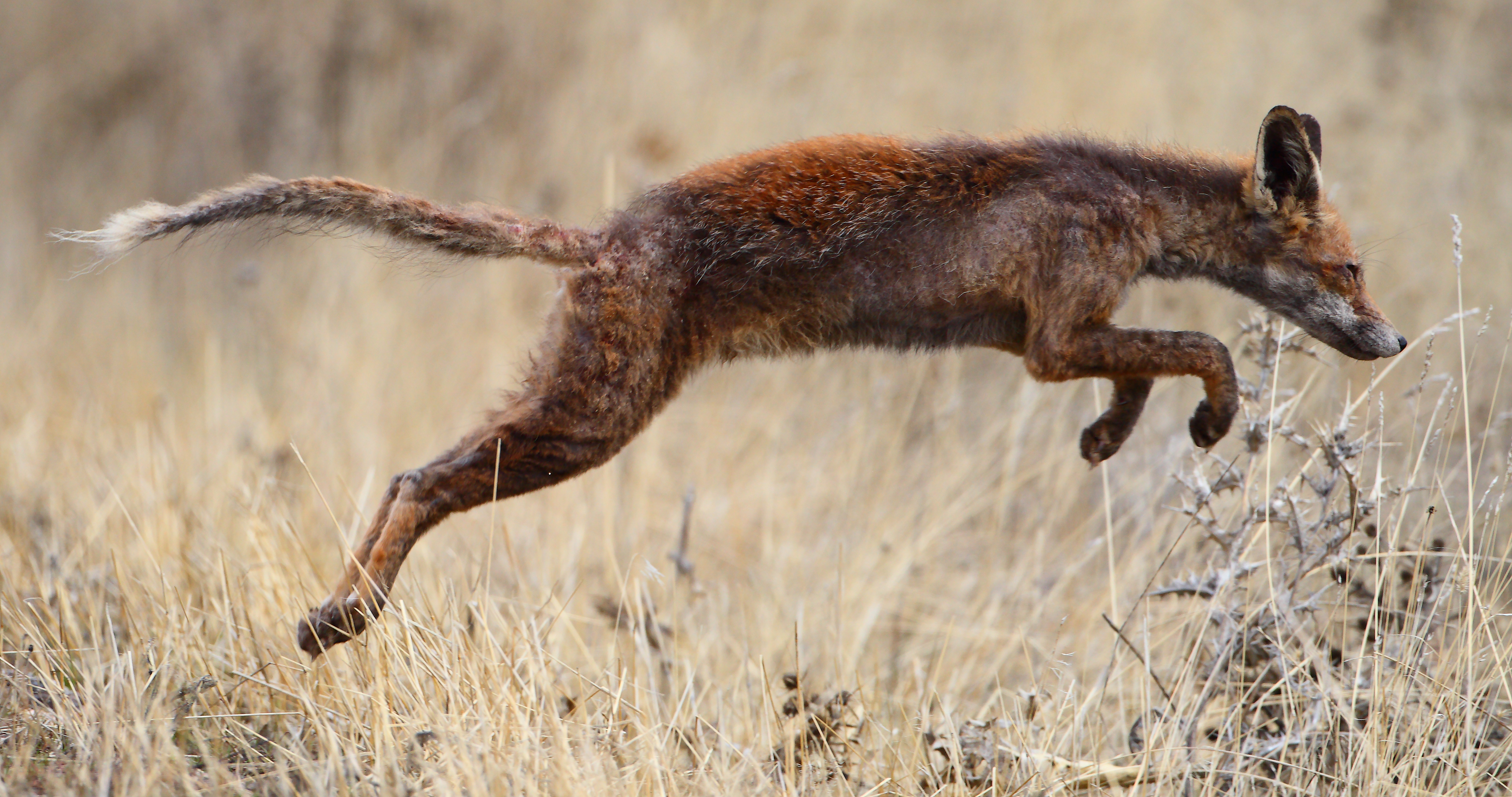
A European fox (V. v. crucigera) with mange

Red foxes are the most important rabies vector in Europe. In London, arthritis is common in red foxes, being particularly frequent in the spine. Red foxes may be infected with leptospirosis and tularemia, though they are not overly susceptible to the latter. They may also fall ill from listeriosis and spirochetosis, as well as acting as vectors in spreading erysipelas, brucellosis and tick-borne encephalitis. A mysterious fatal disease near Lake Sartlan in the Novosibirsk Oblast occurred among red foxes, but the cause was unclear. Individual cases of red foxes infected with Yersinia pestis are known.

Red foxes are not readily prone to infestation with fleas. Species like Spilopsyllus cuniculi are probably only caught from the red fox's prey species, while others like Archaeopsylla erinacei are caught while traveling. Fleas that feed on red foxes include Pulex irritans, Ctenocephalides canis and Paraceras melis. Ticks such as Ixodes ricinus and I. hexagonus are not uncommon in red foxes, and are typically found on nursing vixens and kits still in their earths. The louse Trichodectes vulpis specifically targets red foxes, but is found infrequently. The mite Sarcoptes scabiei is the most important cause of mange in red foxes. It causes extensive hair loss, starting from the base of the tail and hindfeet, then the rump before moving on to the rest of the body. In the final stages of the condition, red foxes can lose most of their fur, 50% of their body weight and may gnaw at infected extremities. In the epizootic phase of the disease, it usually takes red foxes four months to die after infection. Other endoparasites include Demodex folliculorum, Notoderes, Otodectes cynotis (which is frequently found in the ear canal), Linguatula serrata (which infects the nasal passages) and ringworms. Up to 60 helminth species are known to infect captive-bred red foxes in fur farms, while 20 are known in the wild. Several coccidian species of the genera Isospora and Eimeria are also known to infect them. The most common nematode species found in red fox guts are Toxocara canis and Uncinaria stenocephala, Capillaria aerophila and Crenosoma vulpis; the latter two infect their lungs and trachea. Capillaria plica infects the red fox's bladder. Trichinella spiralis rarely affects them. The most common tapeworms in red foxes are Taenia serialis and T. pisiformis. Others include Echinococcus granulosus and E. multilocularis. Eleven trematode species infect red foxes, including Metorchis conjunctus. Red foxes were found to be the hosts of intestinal parasitic acanthocephalan worms, including Pachysentis canicola in Bushehr Province, Iran, Pachysentis procumbens and Pachysentis ehrenbergi in both in Egypt.

== Relationship with humans ==
=== In folklore, religion and mythology ===
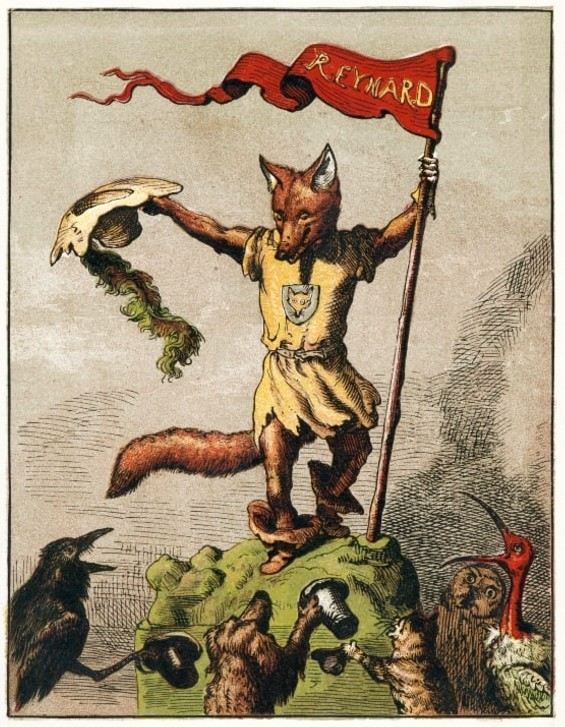
Reynard the Fox in an 1869 children's book

The red fox features prominently in folklore and mythology.

In Greek mythology, the Teumessian fox (also known as the Teumessian vixen and the Cadmean vixen) was a gigantic and divinely sent vixen (female fox) which was destined by fate to never be caught. It was also one of the many children of Typhon and Echidna.

In Celtic mythology, the red fox is a symbolic animal. In the Cotswolds, witches were thought to transform into foxes in order to steal butter from their neighbours. In later European folklore, the figure of Reynard the Fox symbolises trickery and deceit. He first appeared as a secondary character under the name of "Reinardus" in the 1150 epic Ysengrimus, and then in Pierre Saint Cloud's Le Roman de Renart in 1175. He made his debut in England in Geoffrey Chaucer's "The Nun's Priest's Tale". Many of Reynard's adventures may stem from actual observations of red fox behaviour: he is an enemy of the wolf and has a fondness for blackberries and grapes.

Chinese folk tales tell of fox-spirits called huli jing that may have up to nine tails, or gumiho as they are known in Korea. In Japanese mythology, the kitsune are fox-like spirits possessing magical abilities that increase with their age and wisdom. Foremost among these is the ability to disguise themselves as humans. While some folktales speak of kitsune employing this ability to trick others, other stories portray them as faithful guardians, friends, lovers and wives. In Arab folklore, the fox is considered a cowardly, weak, deceitful and cunning animal that feigns death by filling its abdomen with air to appear bloated, then lies on its side, awaiting the approach of unwitting prey. The animal's cunning was noted by the authors of the Bible who applied the word "fox" to false prophets in the Book of Ezekiel 13:4 and the hypocrisy of Herod Antipas in Luke 13:32.

The cunning Fox is a common character in Native American mythology, where it is often portrayed as a constant companion to Coyote. Fox, however, is a deceitful companion who often steals Coyote's food. In the Achomawi creation myth, Fox and Coyote are the co-creators of the world, that leave just before the arrival of humans. The Yurok tribe believed that in a fit of anger, Fox captured the Sun and tied him to a hill, causing him to burn a great hole in the ground. In an Inuit story, Fox is portrayed as a beautiful woman who tricks a hunter into marrying her, only to resume her true form and leave after he offends her. A Menominee story tells of how Fox is an untrustworthy friend to Wolf.

=== Hunting ===
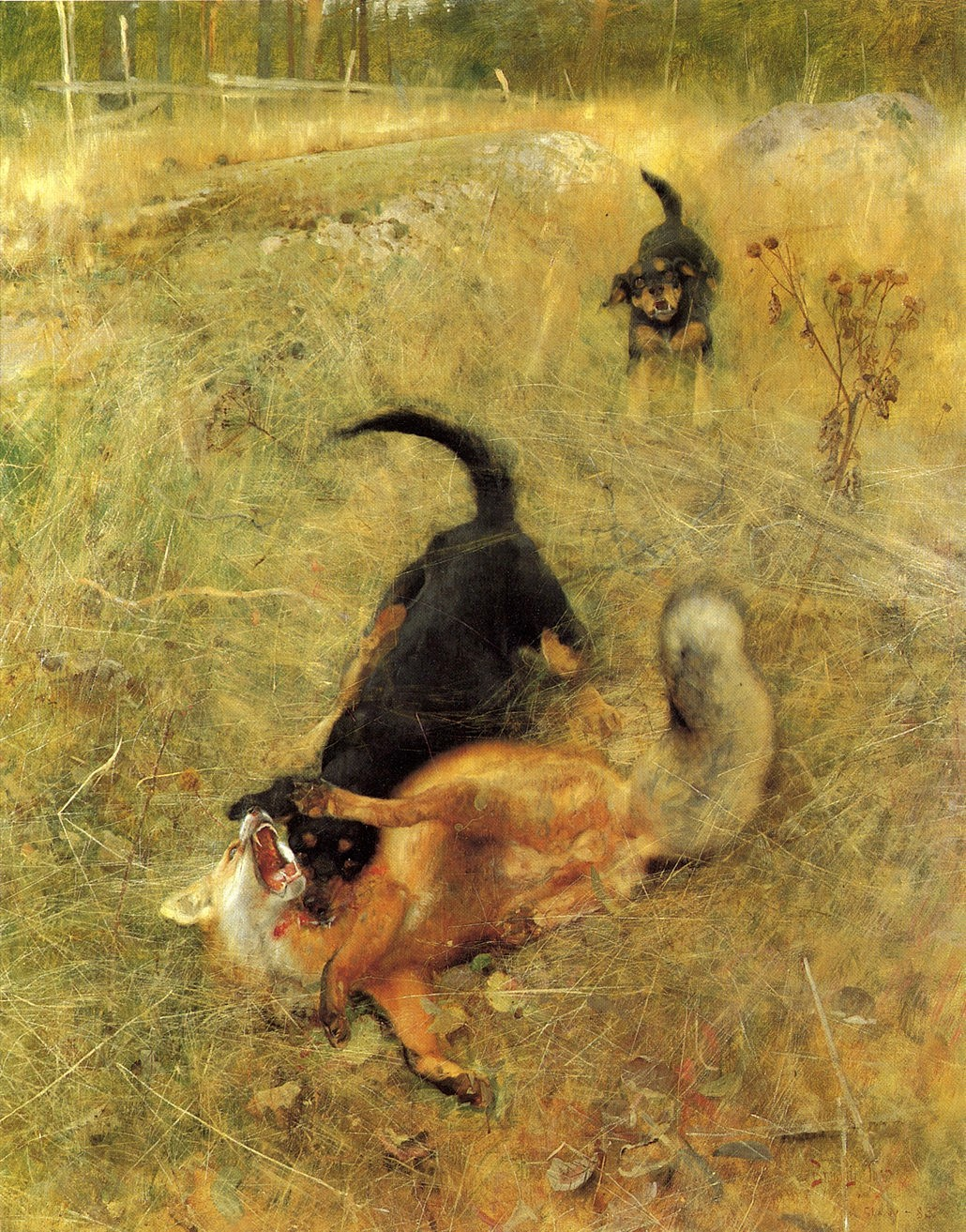
Beagle and Fox (1885) by Bruno Liljefors

The earliest historical records of fox hunting date back to the 4th century BC; Alexander the Great is known to have hunted foxes, and a seal dated from 350 BC depicts a Persian horseman in the process of spearing a fox. Xenophon, who believed that hunting was part of a cultured man's education, promoted killing foxes as pests because they distracted hounds from hares. The Romans were hunting foxes by AD 80. During the Dark Ages in Europe, foxes were considered a secondary quarry, but gradually grew in importance. Cnut the Great reclassified foxes as Beasts of the Chase, which was a lower category of quarry than Beasts of Venery. Foxes were gradually hunted less as vermin and more as Beasts of the Chase, to the point that by the late 1200s, Edward I had a royal pack of foxhounds and a specialised fox huntsman. In this period, foxes were increasingly hunted above ground with hounds, rather than underground with terriers. Edward, 2nd Duke of York assisted the climb of foxes as more prestigious quarries in his treatise The Master of Game. By the Renaissance, fox hunting became a traditional sport of the nobility. After the English Civil War caused a drop in deer populations, fox hunting grew in popularity. By the mid-1600s, Great Britain was divided into fox hunting territories, with the first fox hunting clubs being formed (the first was the Charlton Hunt Club in 1737). The popularity of fox hunting in Great Britain reached its peak during the 1700s. Although already native to North America, red foxes from England were imported for sporting purposes to Virginia and Maryland in 1730 by prosperous tobacco planters. These American fox hunters considered the red fox to be more sporting than the gray fox.

The grays furnished more fun, the reds more excitement. The grays did not run so far, but usually kept near home, going in a circuit of six or eight miles. 'An old red, generally so called irrespective of age, as a tribute to his prowess, might lead the dogs all day, and end by losing them as evening fell, after taking them a dead stretch for thirty miles. The capture of a gray was what men boasted of; a chase after 'an old red' was what they 'yarned' about.

Red foxes are still widely persecuted as pests, with human-caused deaths being one of the main causes of mortality for the species. Annual red fox kills are: UK 21,500–25,000 (2000); Germany 600,000 (2000–2001); Austria 58,000 (2000–2001); Sweden 58,000 (1999–2000); Finland 56,000 (2000–2001); Denmark 50,000 (1976–1977); Switzerland 34,832 (2001); Norway 17,000 (2000–2001); Saskatchewan (Canada) 2,000 (2000–2001); Nova Scotia (Canada) 491 (2000–2001); Minnesota (U.S.) 4,000–8,000 (average annual trapping harvest 2002–2009); New Mexico (U.S.) 69 (1999–2000).

=== Fur use ===
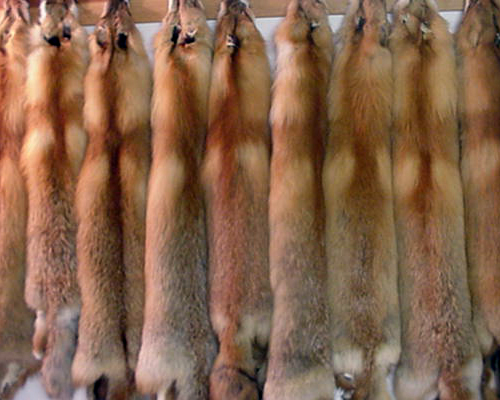
Red fox pelts

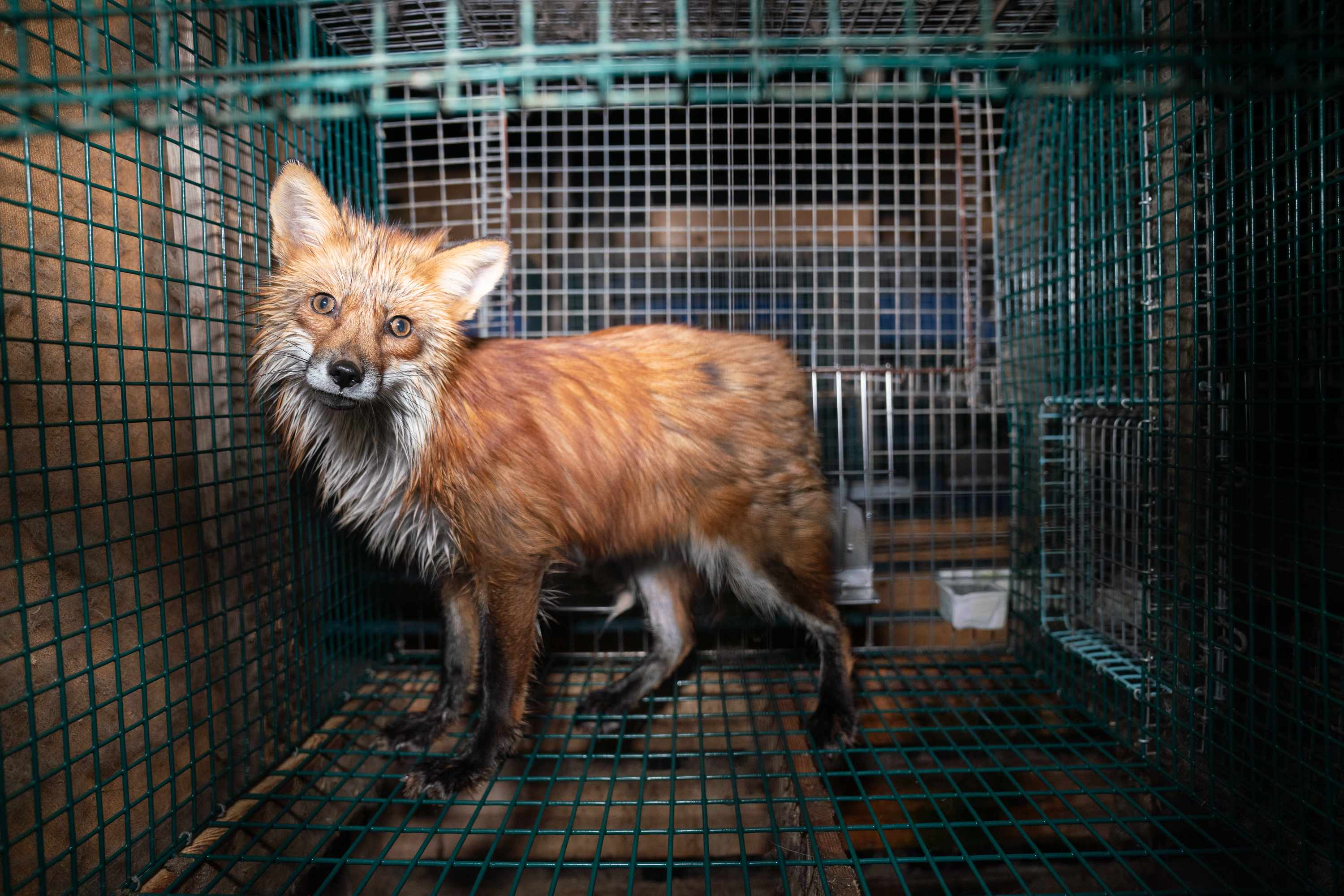
A red fox in a fur farm in Vörå, Finland

Red foxes are among the most important fur-bearing animals harvested by the fur trade. Their pelts are used for trimmings, scarves, muffs, jackets and coats. They are primarily used as trimming for both cloth coats and fur garments, including evening wraps. The pelts of silver foxes are popular as capes, while cross foxes are mostly used for scarves and rarely for trimming. The number of sold red fox scarves exceeds the total number of scarves made from other fur-bearers. However, this amount is overshadowed by the total number of red fox pelts used for trimming purposes. The silver colour morph is the most valued by furriers, followed by the cross colour morph and the red colour morph, respectively. In the early 1900s, over 1,000 American red fox skins were imported to Great Britain annually, while 500,000 were exported annually from Germany and Russia. The total worldwide trade of wild red foxes in 1985–1986 was 1,543,995 pelts. Red foxes amounted to 45% of U.S. wild-caught pelts worth $50 million. Pelt prices are increasing, with 2012 North American wholesale auction prices averaging $39 and 2013 prices averaging $65.78.

Red foxes in North America, particularly those in northern Alaska, are highly valued for their fur. They have guard hairs with a silky texture that allows unrestricted mobility after dressing. However, red foxes living in southern Alaska's coastal areas and the Aleutian Islands are an exception, as their pelts are extremely coarse and rarely fetch more than a third of the price of those from northern Alaska. Compared to North American red fox pelts, most European ones have coarse-textured fur. The only exceptions are Nordic and Far Eastern Russian red fox pelts, which are still inferior to North American ones in terms of silkiness.

=== Livestock and pet predation ===
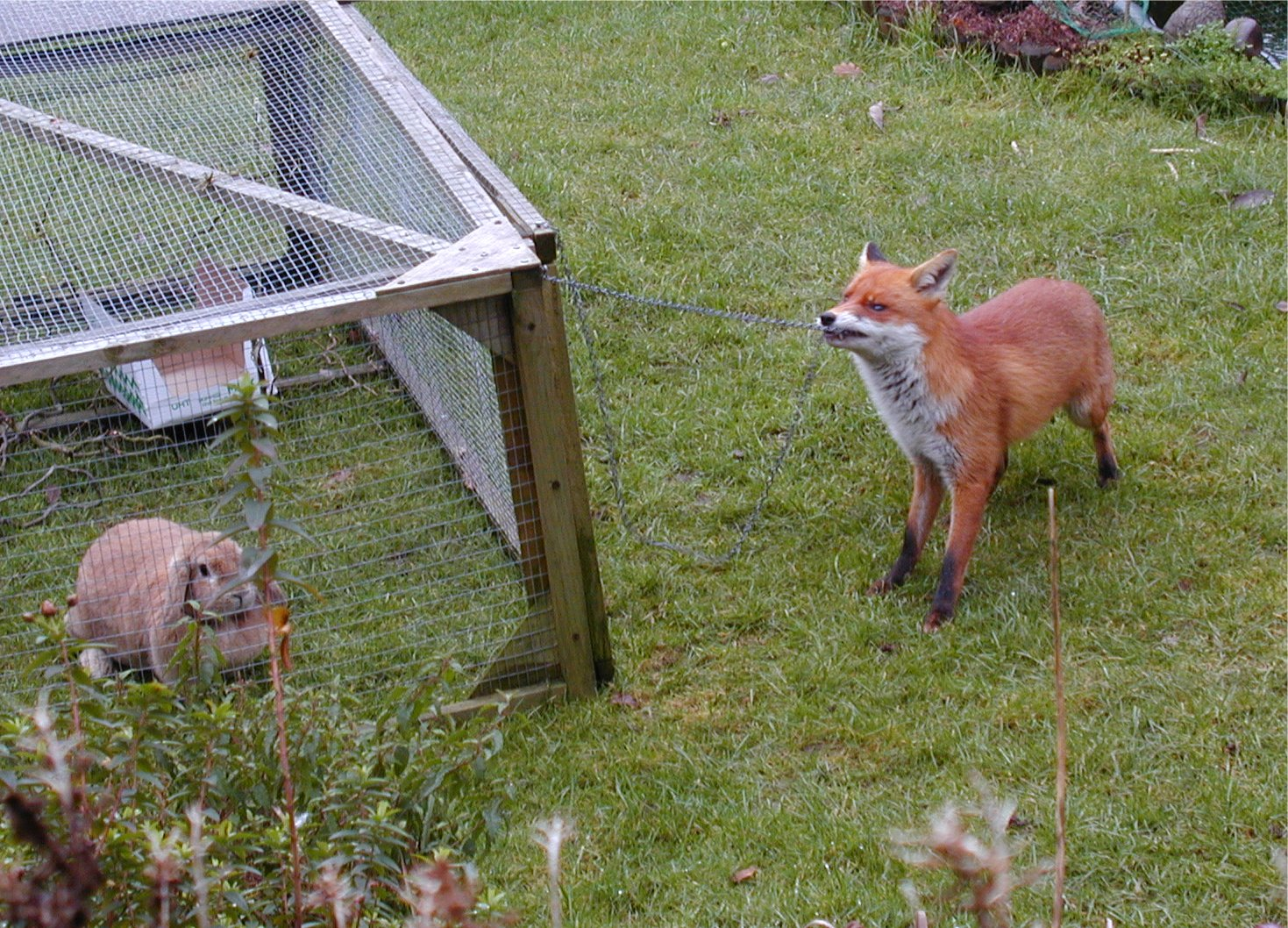
A red fox in a Birmingham garden investigating a rabbit hutch

Red foxes may occasionally prey on lambs. Usually but not always, the lambs targeted are physically weakened specimens. Lambs belonging to smaller breeds, such as the Scottish Blackface, are more vulnerable than larger breeds, such as the Merino. Twins may be more vulnerable to red foxes than single lambs, as ewes cannot effectively defend both simultaneously. Crossbreeding small, upland ewes with larger, lowland rams can result in difficult and prolonged labour for ewes due to the heaviness of the resulting offspring, making them more vulnerable to predation by red foxes. Lambs born to first-time mothers (gimmers) are more often killed by red foxes than lambs born to experienced mothers, who stick closer to their young.

Red foxes may prey on domestic rabbits and guinea pigs if they are kept in open runs or are allowed to roam freely in gardens. This problem can be avoided by housing them in robust hutches and runs. Urban red foxes often encounter domestic cats and may feed alongside them. In physical confrontations, the domestic cats usually have the upper hand. Cases where red foxes have killed domestic cats usually involve kittens. While most red foxes do not prey on domestic cats, some may do so and may treat them more as competitors rather than food.

=== Taming and domestication ===
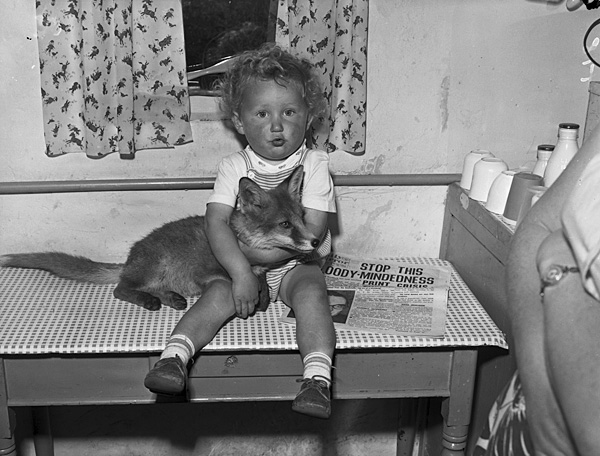
A young boy from Wales holding a tame red fox in 1959

In their unmodified wild state, red foxes are generally unsuitable as pets. Many supposedly abandoned kits are adopted by well-meaning people in spring, although it is unlikely that vixens would abandon their young. Actual orphans are rare, and those that are adopted are probably just kits that have strayed from their dens. Kits require almost constant supervision; when still suckling, they require milk at four-hour intervals day and night. Once weaned, they may become destructive to leather objects, furniture and electric cables. Though generally friendly toward people when young, captive red foxes become fearful of humans, save for their handlers, once they reach 10 weeks of age. They maintain their wild counterparts' strong instinct of concealment and may pose a threat to domestic birds, even when well-fed. Although suspicious of strangers, they can form bonds with both domestic cats and domestic dogs, even breeds of the latter that have been specifically bred to hunt red foxes. Tame red foxes were once used to draw ducks close to hunting blinds.

White to black individual red foxes have been selected and raised on fur farms as "silver foxes". In the second half of the 20th century, a lineage of domesticated silver foxes (Vulpes vulpes forma amicus) was developed by Russian geneticist Dmitry Belyayev who, over a 40-year period, bred several generations selecting only those individuals that showed the least fear of humans. Eventually, Belyayev's team selected only those that showed the most positive response to humans, thus resulting in a population of silver foxes whose behaviour and appearance was significantly changed. After about 10 generations of controlled breeding, these foxes no longer showed any fear of humans and often wagged their tails and licked their human caretakers to show affection. These behavioural changes were accompanied by physical alterations, which included piebald coats, floppy ears in kits and curled tails; these traits are caused by neoteny, which is also the cause of some of the differences between domestic dogs and grey wolves.

=== Urban red foxes ===
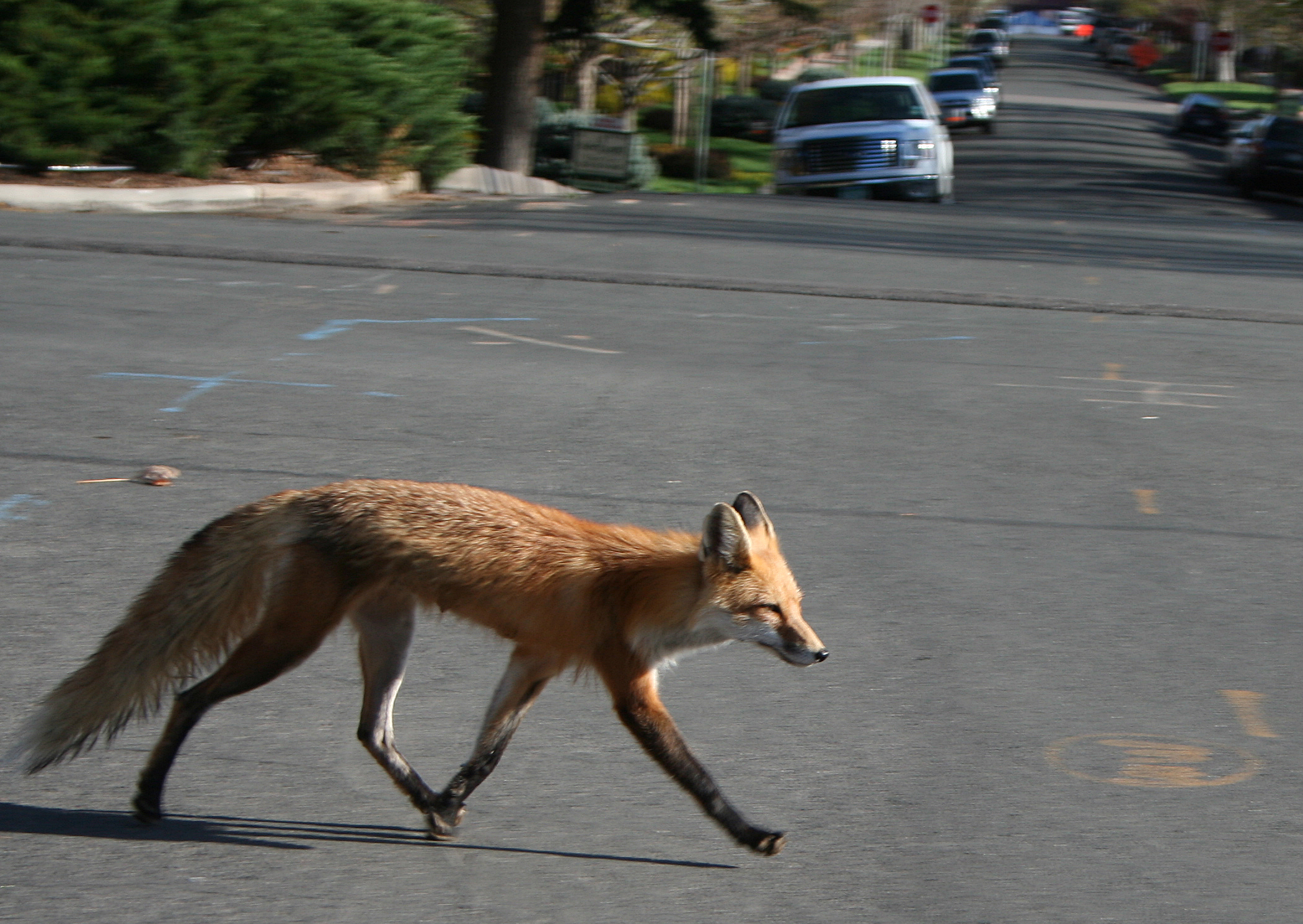
An urban red fox crossing a city street in Denver, Colorado

Red foxes have been extremely successful in colonising built-up environments, particularly lower-density suburbs, although they have also been sighted in densely populated urban areas far from the countryside. Throughout the 20th century, they have established themselves in many Australian, European, Japanese and North American cities. The species first colonised British cities during the 1930s, entering Bristol and London during the 1940s, and later established themselves in Cambridge and Norwich. In Ireland, they are now common in suburban Dublin. In Australia, red foxes were recorded in Melbourne as early as the 1930s, while in Zurich, Switzerland, they only started appearing in the 1980s.

Urban red foxes are most common in residential suburbs consisting of privately owned, low-density housing. They are rare in areas where industry, commerce or council-rented houses predominate. In these latter areas, the distribution is of a lower average density because they rely less on human resources; the home range of these red foxes average from 80–90 ha (0.80–0.90 km^{2}), whereas those in more residential areas average from 25–40 ha (0.25–0.40 km^{2}).

In the UK, it is estimated that the number of urban red foxes rose from 33,000 in 1995 to 150,000 in 2017. Urban red foxes may scavenge food from litter bins and bin bags: research in 2025 suggests that human-generated food comprises 35% of urban red fox diet, compared to just 6% for rural red foxes. As a result of this difference in diet between urban and rural populations, urban red foxes tend to grow larger than rural red foxes. It has been observed that urban red foxes tend to have shorter and wider muzzles, smaller braincases and reduced sexual dimorphism relative to rural red foxes: this is thought to be as a result of differing biomechanical demands of feeding or cognition between habitats.

==== Behaviour ====
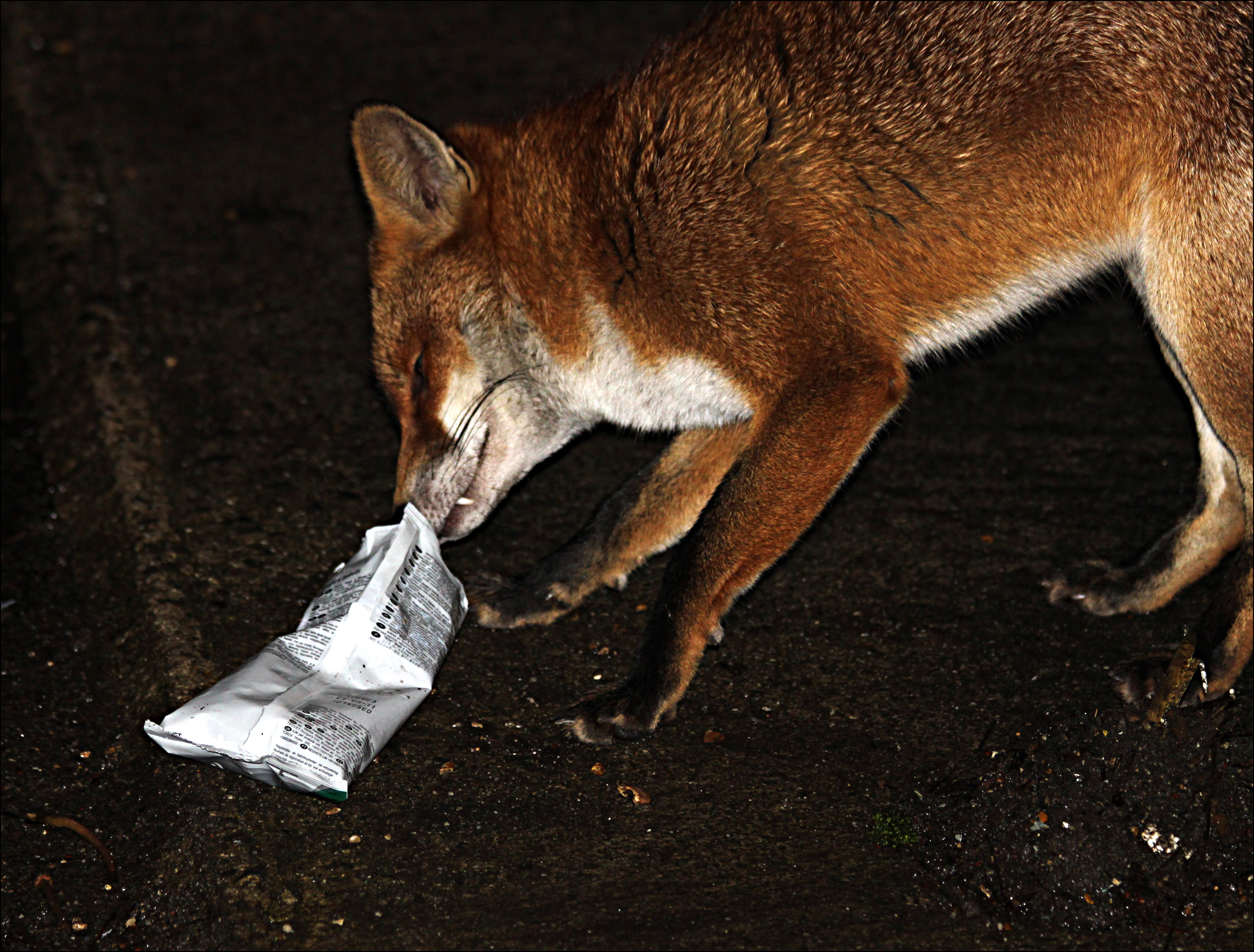
An urban red fox eating from a bag of biscuits in Dorset, England

While urban red foxes can scavenge successfully in cities, eating anything that humans eat, some people deliberately leave food out for them, finding them endearing. Doing this regularly can attract red foxes to one's home, where they can become accustomed to human presence. They may even allow themselves to be approached or played with, particularly young kits.

==== Urban red fox control ====
Urban red foxes can cause problems for local residents. They are known to steal chickens, rummage through rubbish bins and damage gardens. Most complaints about urban red foxes made to local authorities occur during the breeding season, which is from late January to early August. In the UK, hunting red foxes in urban areas is banned, and shooting them in an urban environment is not a suitable alternative. Trapping them appears to be a more viable alternative to hunting urban red foxes. However, killing red foxes has little effect on their urban population; the ones that are killed are quickly replaced by new kits during the breeding season or by other red foxes moving into the territory of those that were killed. A more effective method of controlling red foxes in urban areas is to deter them from specific areas. Deterrents such as creosote, diesel oil or ammonia can be used for this purpose. Cleaning up and blocking access to dens can also discourage red foxes from returning to urban areas.

==== Relationships between urban and rural red foxes ====
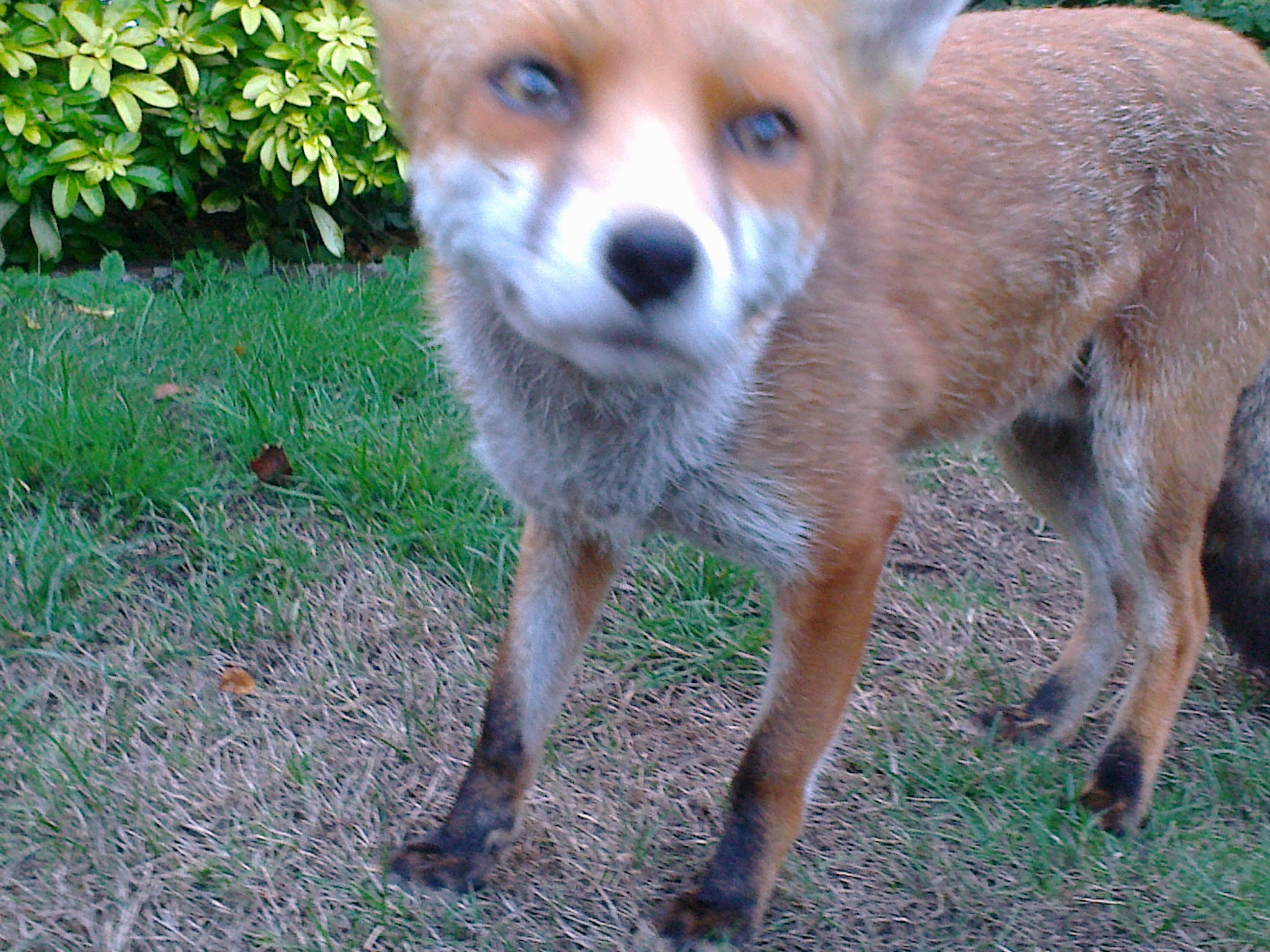
"Fleet", the urban red fox from Brighton featured in the BBC series Winterwatch, set the record for the longest journey undertaken by a tracked urban red fox in the United Kingdom

In January 2014 it was reported that "Fleet", a relatively tame urban red fox tracked as part of a wider study by the University of Brighton in partnership with the BBC TV series Springwatch, had unexpectedly traveled 195 miles in 21 days from his neighbourhood in Hove at the western edge of East Sussex across rural countryside as far as the town of Rye, near the eastern edge of the county. He was still continuing his journey when the GPS collar stopped transmitting due to suspected water damage. Along with setting a record for the longest journey undertaken by a tracked urban red fox in the United Kingdom, his travels have highlighted the fluidity of movement between urban and rural red fox populations.

== See also ==
- Maned wolf – an animal which closely resembles the red fox, but is only distantly related
- Dhole – a canid which occupies parts of India where the red fox does not occur
- Red wolf – another animal with "red" in its name
- The Fox and the Hound – a Walt Disney animated film which prominently features the red fox
