= Cross fox fur =

Type of fur

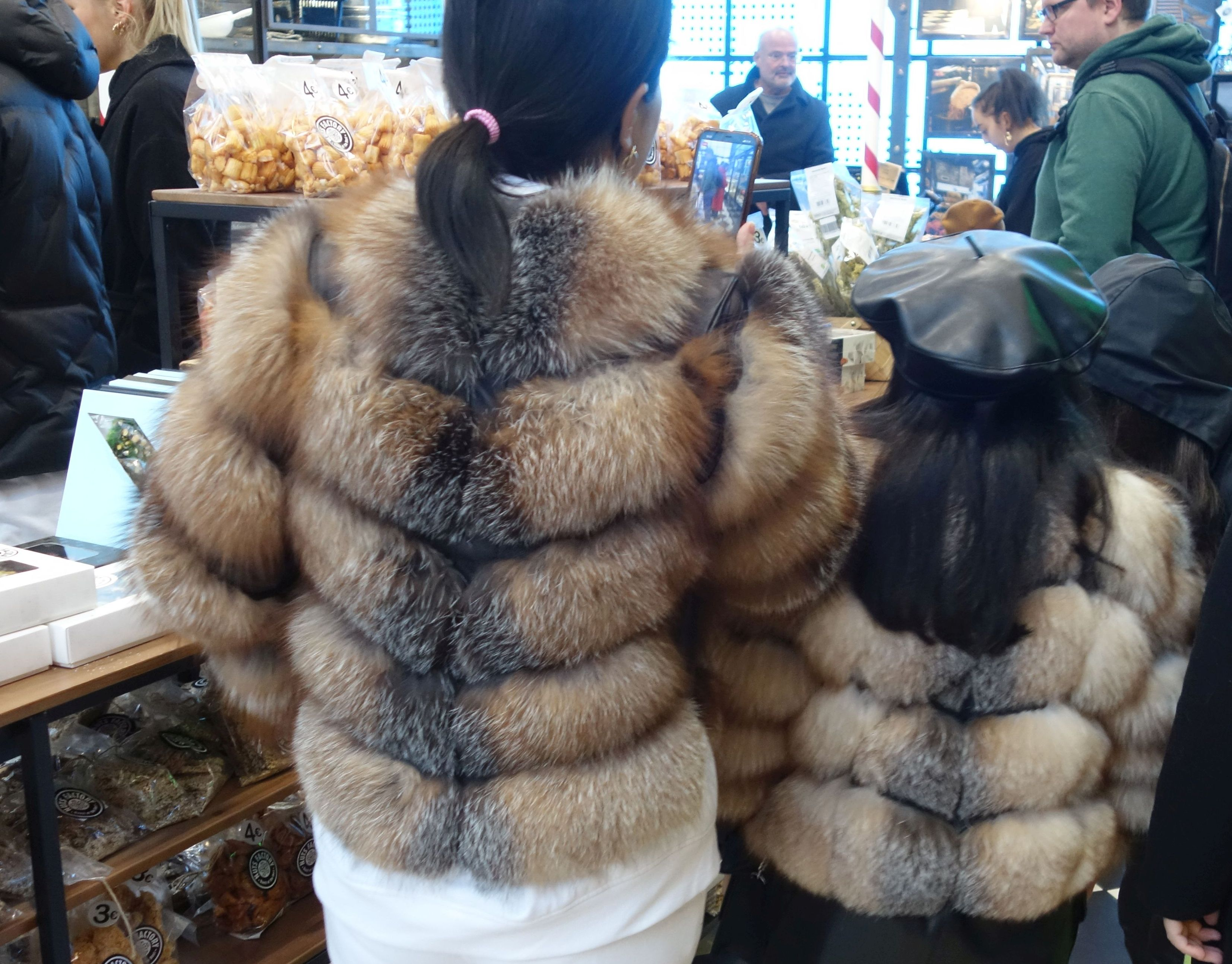
Cross fox fur jackets (2022)

Cross fox fur is a type of fur obtained from the cross fox and turned into a commodity.

The characteristic feature of the cross fox coat is the black or dark cross-like pattern over the neck and shoulders; the back and sides are pale or brownish-yellow, reddish or dark brown, often heavily silvered. The cross fox is a color variation of the red fox.

The fur trade classifies the cross fox fur as a so-called “noble fox fur”, as well as the silver fox fur, the blue fox fur and the arctic fox fur.

The cross fox is distributed almost exclusively in places where silver foxes are also found: in Alaska, Canada, Eastern Siberia and Kamchatka, with other fox pelts now coming from breeding. The amount of wild fox pelts has always been small compared to other fox species due to their smaller occurrence.

== Fur ==
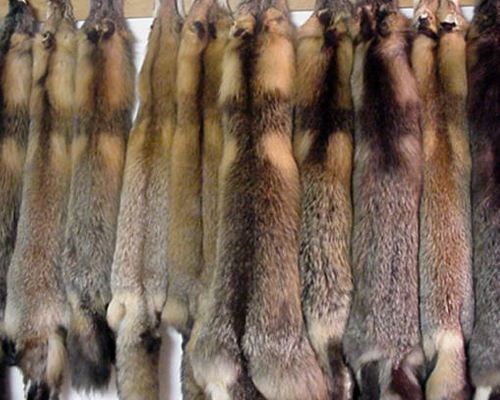
Cross fox pelts

With its considerably varying color of dominant red and recessive black, the cross fox coat stands between the silver fox coat and the red fox coat. Like the silver fox, the cross fox is a subspecies of the red fox. Known for its notably diverse coloration, the coat shows transitions to both red and silver fox. The darkest types are very similar to silver fox fur, while some come very close to red fox fur. MacKendrick distinguishes five color types in the wild cross fox.

A characteristic feature is the black, or at least dark, cross-like markings between the front paws, which spread over the neck and shoulders. The back and sides are various shades of pale or brownish yellow, reddish or dark brown, often with a strong silver tinge. The chest and belly sometimes show more light, sometimes almost dark grey colors.

The best American varieties come from the Labrador Peninsula and the Hudson Bay area. They often show beautiful, clear and contrasting colors and have excellent coat quality.

When fur animals are divided into the fineness categories, among which are silky, fine, medium-fine, coarser and hard, cross fox hair is classified as fine.

== Trade ==
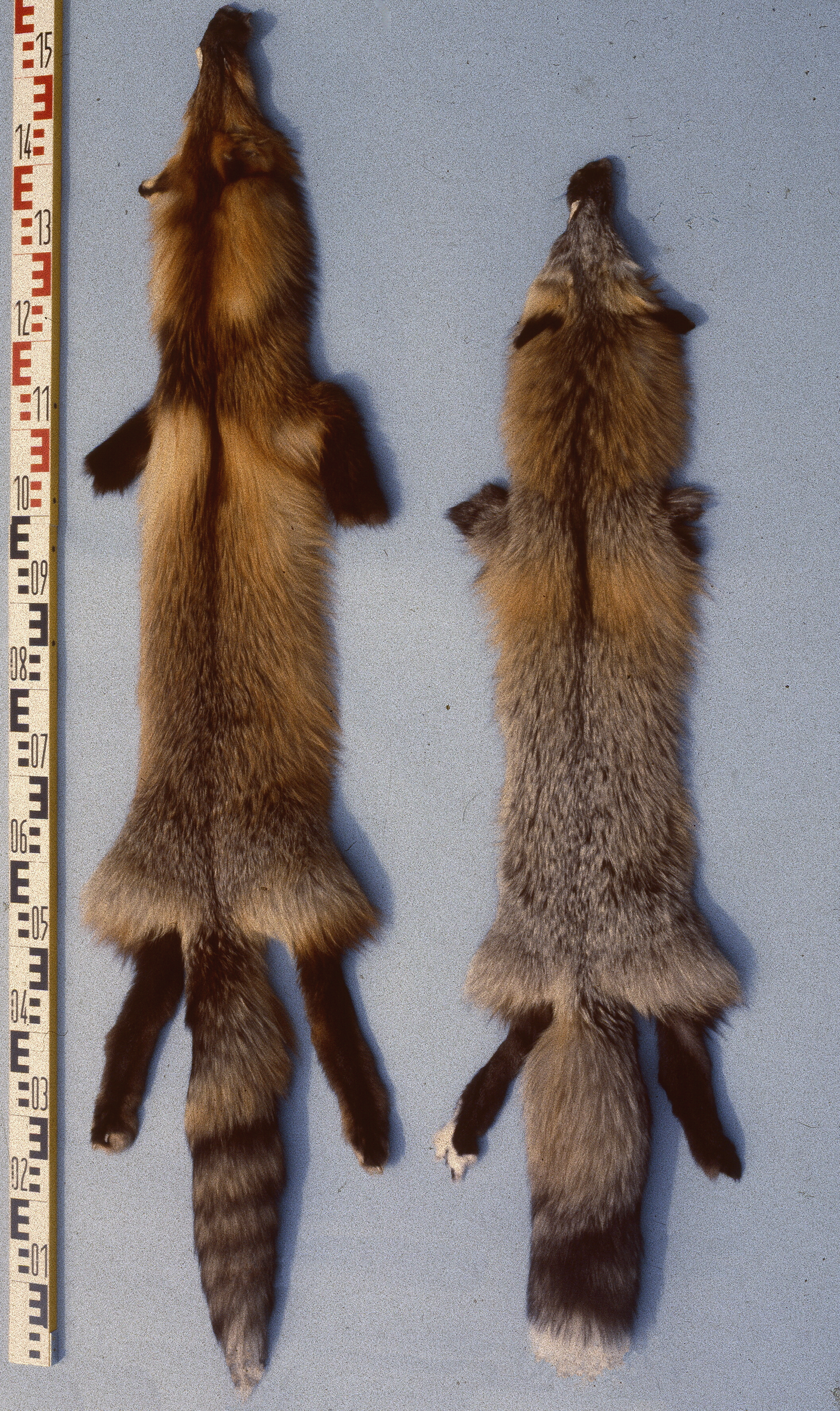
Norwegian cross fox pelt (left), Canadian cross fox pelt (right)

From the beginning of the 20th century until the 1940s, fur fashion was still dominated by long-haired fur types. At this time, cross fox furs fetched considerable prices, which at times were only slightly behind the astonishing prices paid for silver fox furs. When fashion turned to flat-haired furs at the beginning of the Second World War in 1939/40, initially karakul and later mink (in Germany only at the beginning of the currency reform in 1948), cross fox fur also experienced a decline on the market for a long time. Around the 1970s, together with other long-haired fur types, it slowly began to attract more attention again after the red fox, especially for embellishments and hood trimmings. Since the 1990s, it has increasingly been used for these purposes on a larger scale again.

Origins:

• Highly regarded American fur varieties are often sourced from the Labrador Peninsula and the Hudson Bay area. The pelts from these regions are characterized by distinct, contrasting colors, thick and soft undercoat, and long, silky guard hairs.

• Canadian ones (abbreviated): YF – York Fort (around Alberta, Saskatchewan, Manitoba to western Hudson Bay); WA – Western Arctic; EB – Eskimo Bay; FG – Fort George; MR – Moose River; LS – Lake Superior; CANA – Canada.

The classification by size is the same as for the American red fox.

Assortment of Hudson's Bay and Annings Ltd., London (of Canadian origin):

Grades: I, I & II, II, III, IV, Damaged, Hybrid

Colors: fine, dark, medium, medium pale, silvery, pale slate silver, pale, extra pale

• Asian pelts have a yellowish tint, they are often less silvered and have weaker markings.

• The Russian classification distinguishes between cross foxes with a clearly cross-like pattern and Syvodushka foxes, which are more reddish-brown-silvery and have a dark brown undercoat, their belly part and chest are dark gray.

The distinction is made:

1. according to the softness of the hair:

a) silky b) less silky c) coarse

2. according to the density of hair growth:

a) particularly dense b) dense c) medium dense d) less dense

3. By types:

1st type: Full-haired, completely hairy, with dense, regular upper hair over the entire surface of the fur and with dense undercoat; hairy tail.

2nd type: Pelage not completely hairy, upper hair and undercoat a little shorter, especially on the back; hairy tail.

3rd type: Semi-haired (transitional spring and fall coats); upper hair and undercoat are dense but short. Tail with little hair.

4th type: Short hair growth, undercoat dense but short, belly part also short-haired.

The pelts are usually delivered in a round shape, with the hair facing outwards.

In 1950, it was stated for Russia: “The supply of cross foxes, which occur in spring and summer, and the trade with such pelts is prohibited.”.

== Breeding ==
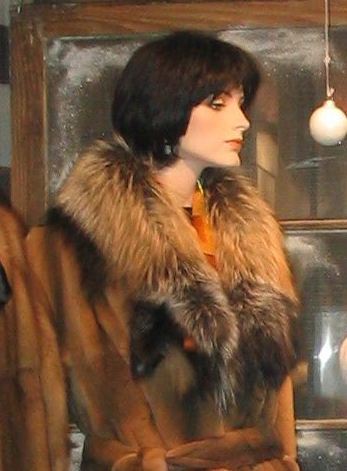
Cross fox fur collar (2006)

The question of how the red fox comes to this color has been controversial for a long time. Investigations at the American experimental farm Saratoga Springs and the Moscow zoo farm Pushkino clearly showed that it is a hybrid form of the red fox. Cross foxes cannot be bred purely; they always split into red, cross and silver foxes. For example, the so-called “patch fox”, which is more similar to the silver fox but has gray and brownish markings on the shoulders and back, results from the mating of the Alaskan silver fox and the Canadian silver fox, which behave genetically differently. Crossing the Alaskan silver fox and the East American red fox results in animals with a more colorful and lively fur. Crossing the Canadian silver fox with the European silver fox produces the so-called hybrid fox. The coloration varies greatly, ranging from red fox to cross fox. However, the colors and markings are predominantly darker than those of the red fox.

The breeding of the cross fox began in the 1920s, the peak of the long-haired fur fashion. However, when prices fell due to the Great Depression, breeders quickly lost interest. Nevertheless, 165 silver foxes from Alaska were released in Finland at the end of the 1930s and mated with the native red foxes, achieving the hoped-for results. As mentioned, this mating results in a variety of hybrid foxes with all the transitions from red fox to cross fox.

The Scandinavian breeders' association Saga offers a fur type with a "wild" look in limited numbers under the name Gold Cross Fox. The color varies from dark gray to dark red, always with a distinctive cross pattern.

== Processing ==
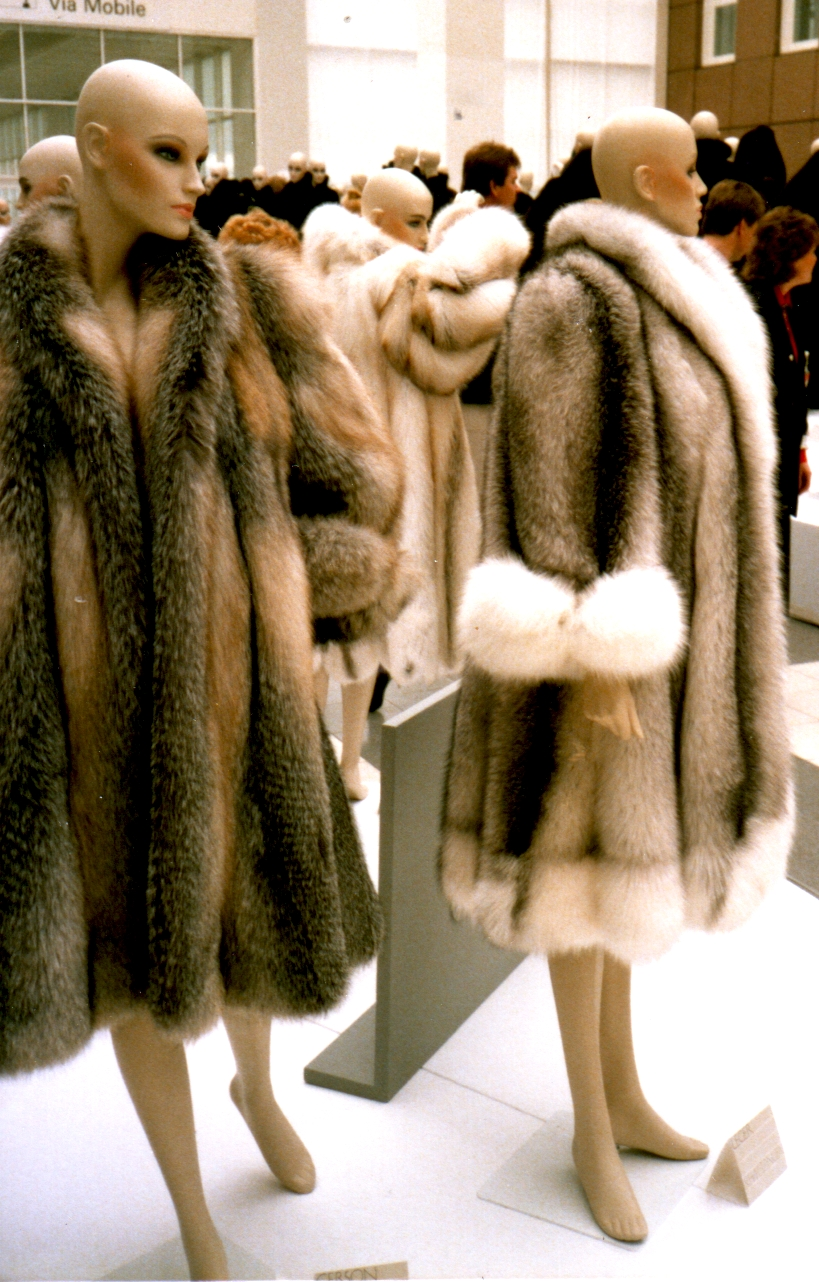
“Taped” cross fox coat on the left (ca. after 1990)

Cross fox fur is rarely made into coats and occasionally into jackets and fur blankets; it is mostly used for decorative trimmings and hood trimmings.

In 1762, its use for man muffs, clothing linings and lapels is mentioned.

Until about the 1970s, cross fox coats and jackets were also not common; however, their small percentage within high-quality fox mass production approximately corresponded to their share of overall production.

Since the introduction of the fur sewing machine around 1900, it has been possible to change the shape of cross fox fur as desired by means of the process known as letting out. Narrow V- or A-shaped cuts are used to cut the pelts to any desired length at the expense of width, right down to a floor-length evening coat. The fur-saving ‘’taping’’ technique (or, in this case, ‘’leathering’’) is used to increase the size of fur, mainly from foxes, by inserting leather strips into the fur surface. The simultaneous loosening of the hair also takes place in the process called ‘’air taping’’ (also known as air galloon), in which the leather is cut and the fur is stretched in the form of a net.

In 1965, the consumption for a fur plate sufficient for a cross fox coat was given as 16 to 20 furs (so-called bodies, i.e. semi-finished products). This was based on a plate with a length of 112 centimeters (44 in) and an average width of 150 centimeters (59 in) and an additional sleeve part. This corresponds approximately to a fur material for a slightly flared coat in European size 46 (as of 2014). The maximum and minimum fur amount can result from the different sizes of the sexes of the animals, the age groups and their origin. Depending on the type of fur, these three factors have different effects.

As with most types of fur, every piece of fur from the cross fox is used. Fox pieces, fox belly parts and fox paw plates are made from the fur scraps that fall off during processing. The main place for recycling the fur waste produced in Europe is Kastoria in Greece and the smaller town of Siatista nearby. Most of these semi-finished products are re-exported and then made into fur linings, jackets, coats and trimmings. The tails are used as pendants for key rings, bags, etc., and also as boas when fashionable.

The processing does not differ significantly from that of other noble fox species. Cross fox fur is usually used undyed.

Red fox pelts in particular were dyed to resemble cross foxes in times when the cross fox was held in high esteem: “The hair is subjected to a coating killing (10cm³ ammonia in 1 liter of water), then the base color is applied… This base color is allowed to oxidize and dry for a few hours. Then the covering color is painted on with the help of stencils, including the cross."

== Data ==
- In 1855, 786 cross fox pelts with a total value of £4838 were traded from the lands of the Hudson's Bay Company; in the same year, 920 pelts worth £2740 came from Alaska, Canada and other places.
- In 1875, there were 786 pelts from the Hudson's Bay Company lands with a total value of £3870; in the same year there were 1451 pelts valued at £6587 from Alaska, Canada, Oregon and the Northwestern States, bought from small traders and sold in London.
- 1891 to 1910

Import of American cross fox furs by the Hudson's Bay Company in London 1891-1910
| 1891 | 1892 | 1893 | 1894 | 1895 | 1896 | 1897 | 1898 | 1899 | 1900 | 1901 | 1902 | 1903 | 1904 | 1905 | 1906 | 1907 | 1908 | 1909 | 1910 |
|---|---|---|---|---|---|---|---|---|---|---|---|---|---|---|---|---|---|---|---|
| 2656 | 2415 | 2622 | 2791 | 4657 | 6240 | 5838 | 4845 | 3210 | 1359 | 1255 | 1704 | 1842 | 2195 | 3626 | 4998 | 5444 | 3173 | 1777 | 1377 |

- 1891 to 1906

Import of American cross fox furs by C. M. Lampson & Co., London 1891-1906
| 1891 | 1892 | 1893 | 1894 | 1895 | 1896 | 1897 | 1898 | 1899 | 1900 | 1901 | 1902 | 1903 | 1904 | 1905 | 1906 |
|---|---|---|---|---|---|---|---|---|---|---|---|---|---|---|---|
| 2951 | 2363 | 3788 | 4020 | 8460 | 5106 | 5192 | 3410 | 4521 | 4531 | 2971 | 2771 | 2957 | 2929 | 2878 | 5527 |

- 1907 to 1910

Import of American cross fox furs for the London auctions 1907-1910
| 1907 | 1908 | 1909 | 1910 |
|---|---|---|---|
| 3749 | 3652 | 3297 | 2759 |

- Before 1911, America supplied 15.000 cross fox pelts, Siberia around 3000.
- 1911

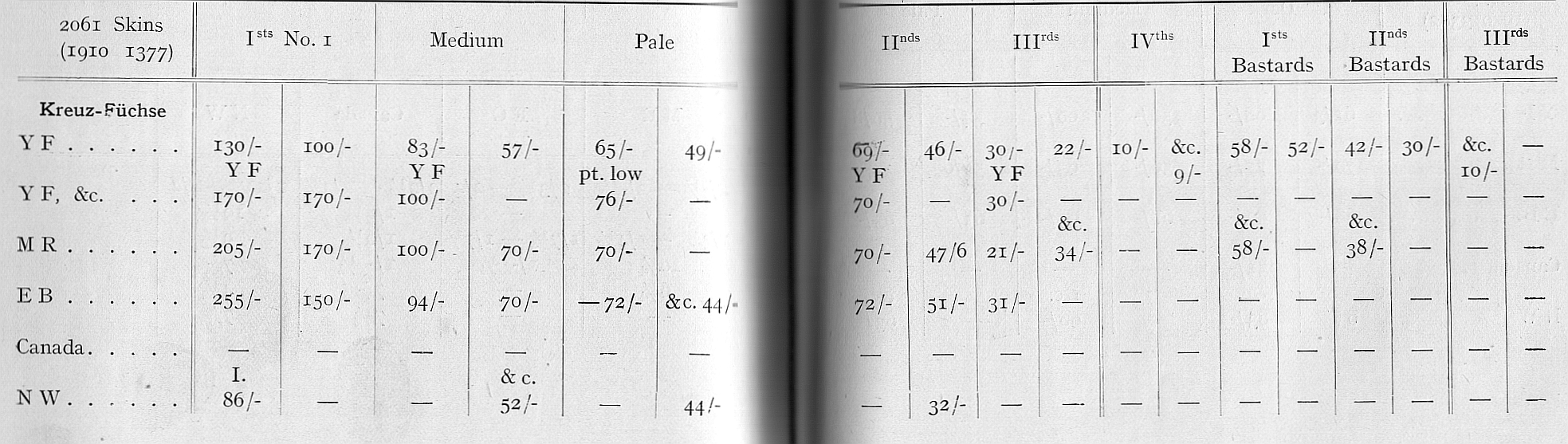
Prices of cross fox furs from the Hudson's Bay Co. auction, March 1911

- Before 1944, the maximum price for cross fox pelts was: best quality – RM 185; medium quality – RM 185; low quality – RM 25.
- In 1947, 45.145 American and 3000 Asian cross foxes came to the auctions. The average number of pelts at that time was assumed to be 50.000 to 70.000 American ones and 5000 to 7000 Asian ones. In 1949, the maximum price was $12.50.
- In 1988, it was not possible to obtain exact figures, but it was probably only a few thousand, most of them from the wild.
- In the 2011–2012 season, to the surprise of trappers, the price for the best cross fox pelts rose by up to 135 percent compared to the previous year, for example, up to $100 at the Fur Harvester auction, with an average price of $62.84.
