= Arctic fox fur =

Type of fur

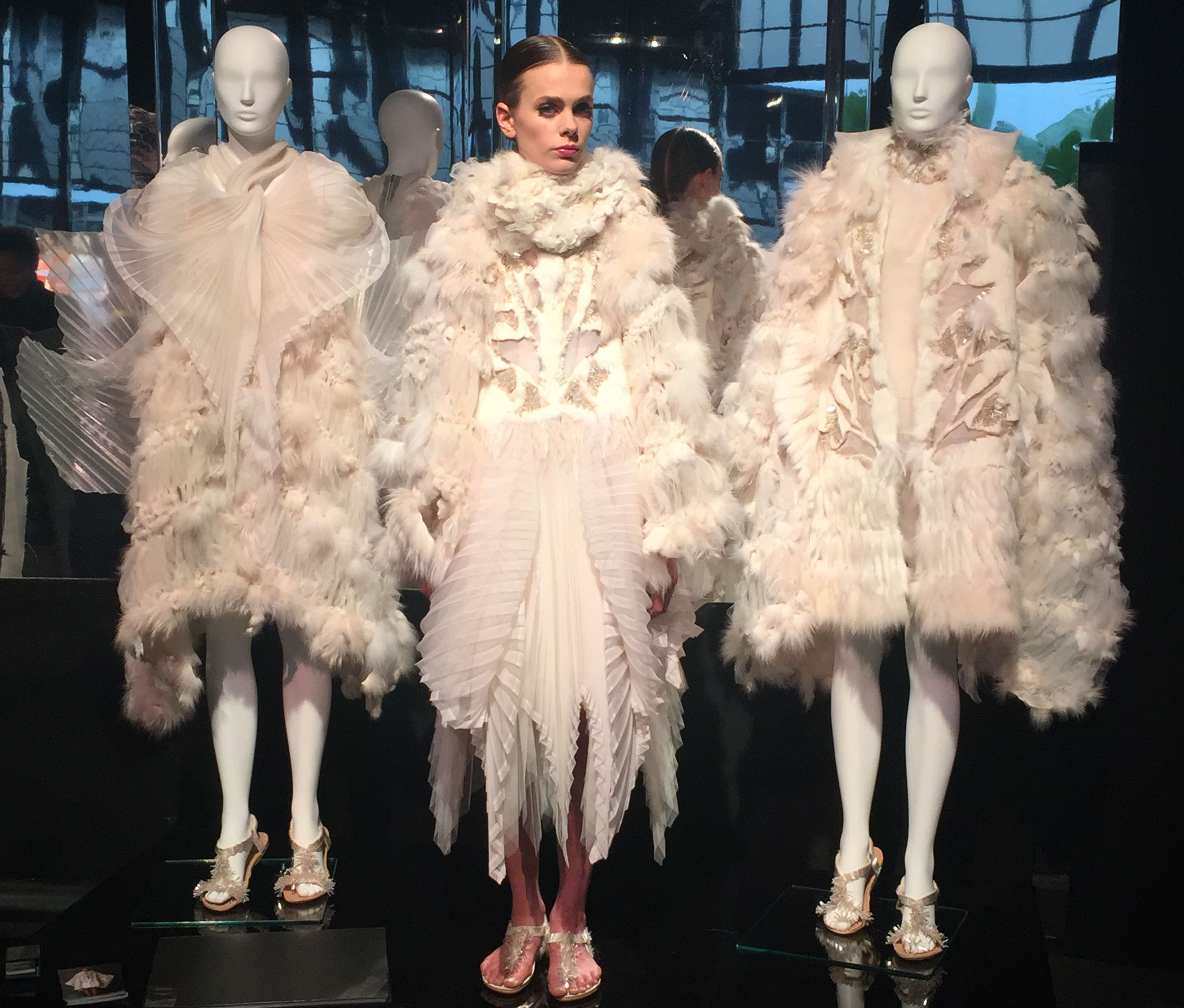
Textile with white fox (Daniel Kohavi, 2016)

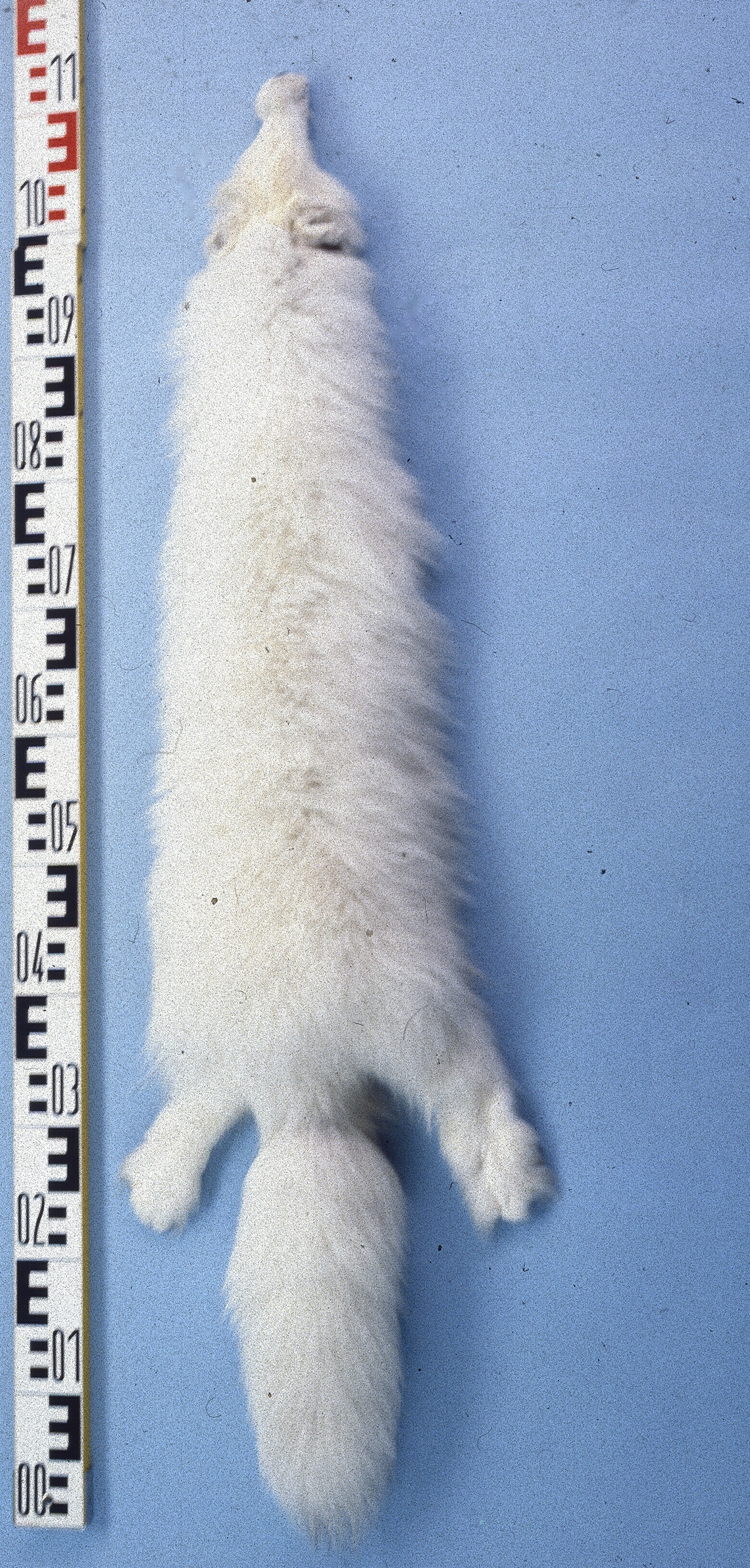
Arctic fox pelt

Arctic fox fur is a type of fur obtained from the arctic fox (also known as the polar fox) and turned into a commodity. The arctic fox is zoologically divided into two color varieties, the white fox and the blue fox, whose fur is also a commodity as blue fox fur.

The white fox, the color variety of the arctic fox, lives in the entire northern polar zone. The retail trade rarely differentiates between the arctic fox fur and the white form of the blue fox, usually the dissimilar fur types are offered as white fox, even a Scandinavian auction house refers to pure white blue foxes as white fox. However, there are relatively few actual arctic fox pelts on the market.

The fur trade classifies the arctic fox fur among the so-called noble fox furs, such as the silver fox fur, the blue fox fur and the cross fox fur.

== Fur ==
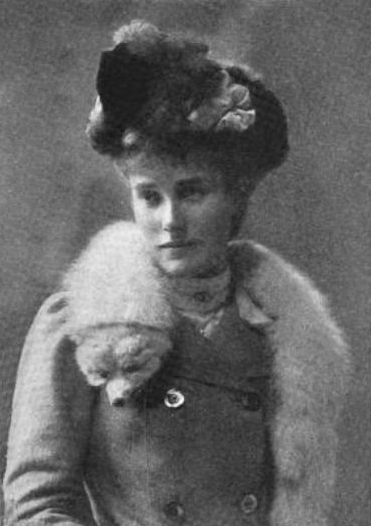
Arctic fox fur stole (1901)

The fur of the arctic or white fox is about 46 to 68 cm (18 to 27 in) long, the tail is 30 to 40 cm (12 to 15.5 in) long. The size of the pelt is often different every year, even if the pelts come from the same territory, presumably due to different food availability, especially the occurrence of lemmings (which are part of their diet). The pelts from eastern Canada are somewhat smaller than those from the western part. Early catches are smaller than late ones. The trappers were aware of this, but the abundance is greater in spring, so they accepted it for the sake of the higher yield. Farm animals are significantly larger on average. The paws are densely coated in winter. The fur is on average smaller and the tail shorter than that of the blue fox. The very soft hair is long, fine and more silky than that of the red fox and the blue fox (see fineness categories below), with partly long guard hair. The dense undercoat is the most matted of all fox species. Smaller coats are sometimes silkier than larger ones.

The summer coat of the white fox is stone-gray to gray-brownish, almost olive-brown, sometimes even darker, with red tones; the flanks are correspondingly lighter, the belly tends to whitish, the thighs resemble the flanks in color. The legs and their soles are brownish gray. In the developing young foxes, there are still considerable differences in the moulting phases. A dark band runs cross-shaped from the dark dorsal stripe down to the legs, hence the name “cross fox” for the summer coat. The tail is brownish at the top, otherwise lighter with pale reddish fox shades, the head is brownish gray, the ears are gray-brown at the back and white on the inside. The winter coat is pure white, sometimes delicately cream-colored to yellowish. The undercoat is white to blue-white. (Further distinctions between the developmental stages can be found down below in the Trade and History section.) The arctic fox wears its winter coat from December to January. In Greenland, the fur remains white all year round due to the short summer. At an average of 4.6 cm (1.8 in), the winter guard hair is twice as long as in summer, while the undercoat is 3.8 cm (1.5 in) long. The winter hair is also thicker. 97 percent of the hair is wool, only 3 percent of guard hair.

In general, the undercoat is very strong; the upper hair does not always cover it well. When stroked with one’s hand, the dense, dull undercoat offers more resistance than a sturdy coat. Woolly coats have rubbed buttocks (rear parts of the coat). The durability coefficient for fine fox fur is given as 50 to 60 percent. (Note: The comparative values (coefficients) given are the result of comparative testing by furriers and fur traders with regard to the degree of apparent wear (usage). The numbers are not unambiguous; in addition to subjective observations of durability in practice, each individual case is influenced by tanning and finishing as well as numerous other factors. A more precise figure could only be determined on a scientific basis. The classification was made in steps of 10 percent each. The most durable fur types based on practical experience were set at 100 percent.) When fur animals are divided into the fineness categories, among which are silky, fine, medium-fine, coarser and hard, white fox hair is classified as fine.

== Trade and history ==
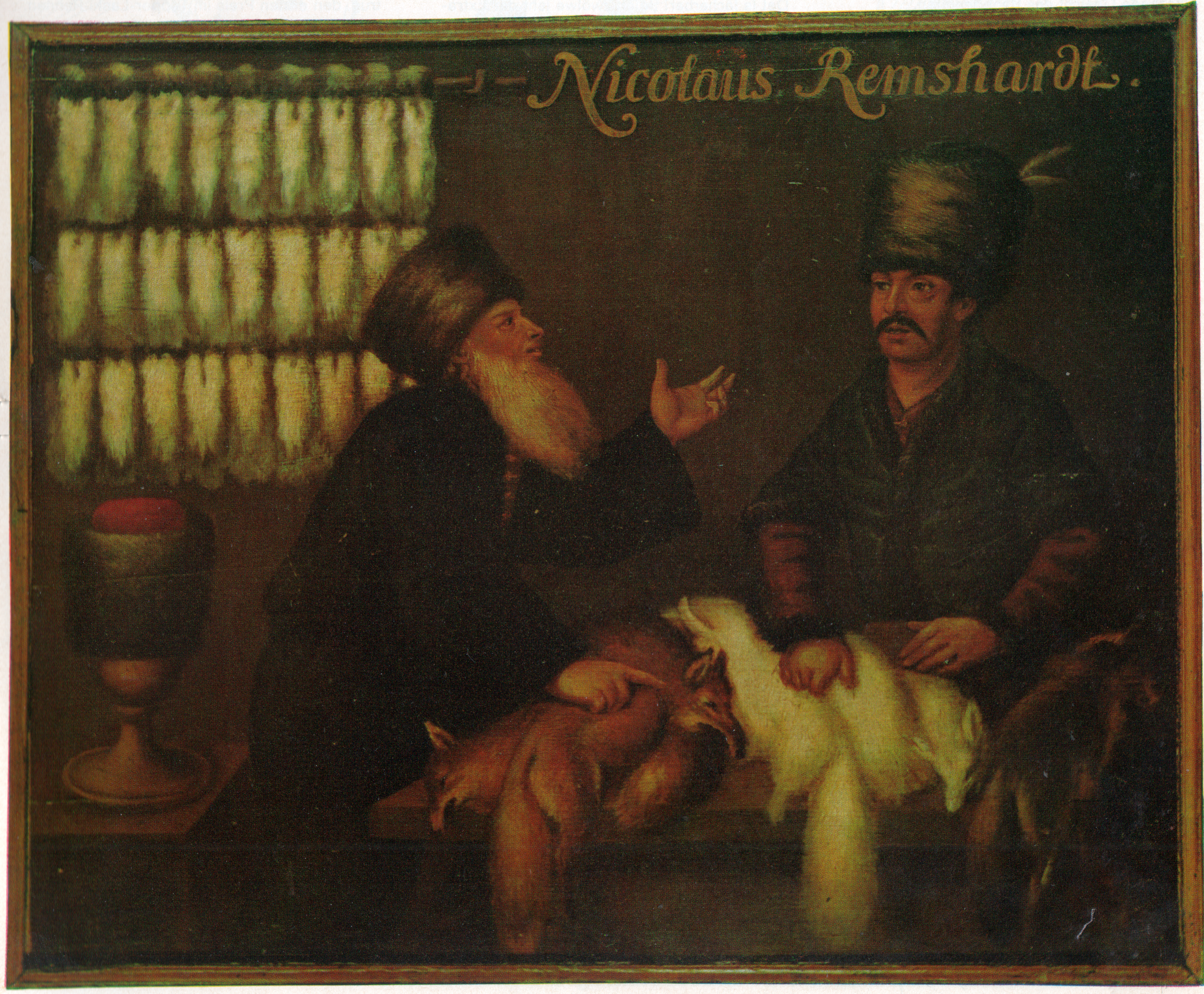
White fox furs on the sales table of furrier Nicolaus Remshardt from Göppingen. His sign on the stand (around 1800)

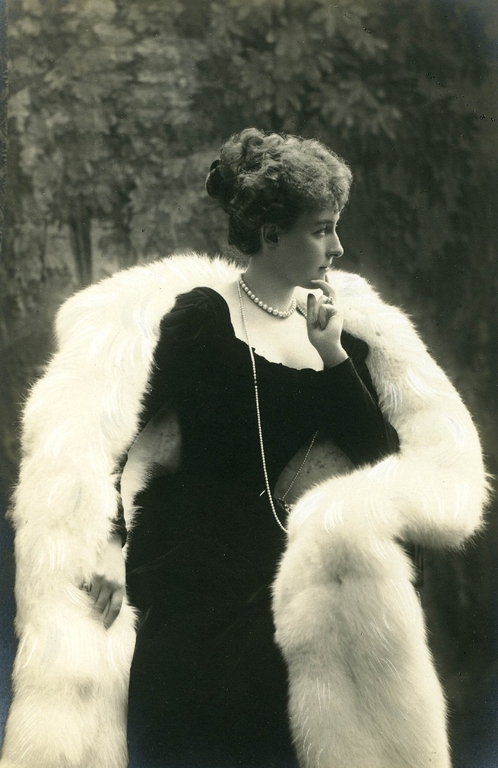
Hélène of Orléans (1871–1951), Princess of Orléans, Duchess of Aosta, in 1903, at the beginning of the white fox fashion

Blue fox fur has always been considered more valuable than that of the white fox. In some areas, the targeted hunting of blue foxes resulted in the former balance shifting in favour of the white foxes; on Bering Island, the blue foxes were destroyed “down to a meagre remnant”. In 1858, a Russian decree even ordered the killing of all white foxes while at the same time restricting the hunting of blue foxes.

In 1762, the import of white foxes from “Russia, the North and Poland” is mentioned. “Hungarian furs are lined with these fox skins.". In 1883, the frequent use of white fox fur is also mentioned for Poland and Russia itself and in Turkey: “Furs with white fox lining are a much sought-after item, especially by Turkish women.”

In 1821, the Englishman John Dundas Cochrane found an already well-organized Chukchi fur market “in the remotest corner of Siberia”, on the ice of the Anyuy River behind Nizhny Kolymsk. The valuable black fox furs were offered there for 35 to 210 thalers, silver foxes for 70 thalers, red and gray foxes for 14 to 21 thalers, reddish-brown foxes for 5 thalers, blue foxes for 2 to 3 thalers and white fox furs for 2/3 to 2 thalers.

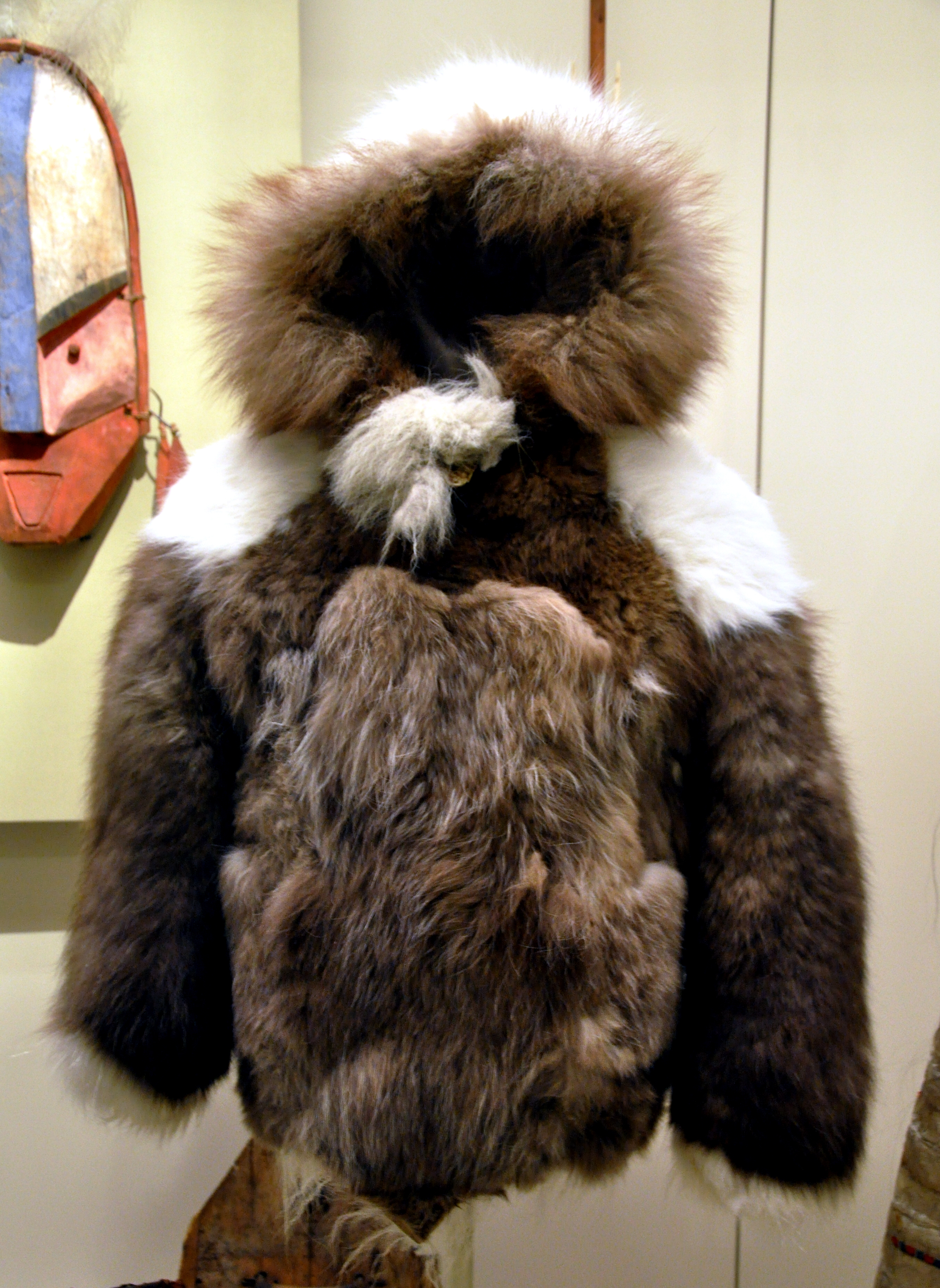
Kapatak, Inuit hooded jacket made of bear and arctic fox fur (Qaanaaq, Greenland 1973)

Apparently the great era of white fox fashion began with a Diva who caused a sensation with a white fox fur. (Note: The name of the Diva remains unknown in the source.) In 1931, another diva, the actress Marlene Dietrich, caused quite a stir when she appeared at the Berlin Press Ball wearing “a fabulous evening coat made of white crêpe suéde with six white foxes as trimmings from the Max Becker model house”.

Until the summer of 1915, hardly any trappers had bothered to catch the fox with the less valuable fur; only the Eskimos used it to line their pants. The Eskimos also later delivered the pelts without the front paws, which they kept as souvenirs, presumably out of a religious tradition. There were hardly any white foxes in the Hudson's Bay Company's previous hunting ground, so part of the hunt shifted to the Canadian Antarctic, which had previously only been visited by individual expeditions, with the help of the local Inuit. The trading posts were soon so far north that the polar explorer Knud Rasmussen (1879–1933) wrote: “Along Canada's Arctic coast lies trap after trap like a single pair of steel scissors, mercilessly snapping at any unwary white fox that allows itself to be tempted by the inviting bait”. With the hunt for the arctic fox, Canada also practically took possession of the Arctic islands, and the entire organization there was created just for this purpose. According to the Canadian Dominion Bureau of Statistics, the annual harvest before 1970 was around 45 to 55 thousand pelts, compared to only a few hundred of the rare blue foxes.

The white fox was one of the main sources of livelihood for the Russian population who lived from hunting. When far-reaching hunting led to an extreme decline in populations and market prices collapsed at the same time, this had a catastrophic effect on the economic situation of the indigenous peoples of northern Canada and Alaska at the beginning of the 1930s. In the 1960s, around 65 thousand pelts from there were again traded annually. In North America, blue and white fox pelts were almost a kind of fur money in a barter trade with the Eskimos.

The summer fur of the Arctic fox is not traded. However, until the First World War, these down-soft pelts were a sought-after item for light, but warm and durable lining, but hunting and trapping of Arctic foxes of this age is now prohibited. Pelts hunted shortly before (flat, bluish) or after the main season (“ragged shedding”) are considered practically worthless.

The particular stages of development for white foxes are described by the Russian trade as follows: kopanez (until the 10th day of life); slepuschonka (1 to 2 months old; fur dark brown, almost black; with sparse guard hairs); nornik (2 to 4 months old; coat browner; guard hairs somewhat more abundant); krestowatik (summer coat; hair brightened up on dewlap and sides; a brown stripe along the back and shoulders forms a kind of cross); sinjak or tschajatschnik (6 to 8 months old; grayish, bluish (lead-colored); September to mid-October); nedopesok (mid-to-late October: grayish-white; sparse brown guard hairs, bluish/blue undercoat); polny, rosly or doschly (from November: white winter coat with thick, luxuriant hair; sometimes a slightly bluish sheen at the base of the coat, occasional bluish–dark brown guard hairs); Weschnjak (end of winter; weaker hair growth); Gagara (from April; during moulting, the coat has hardly any guard hairs).

Origins:

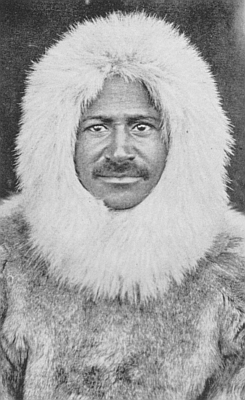
Matthew Henson (1866–1955) directly after a polar expedition, wearing a reindeer fur jacket with arctic fox trim

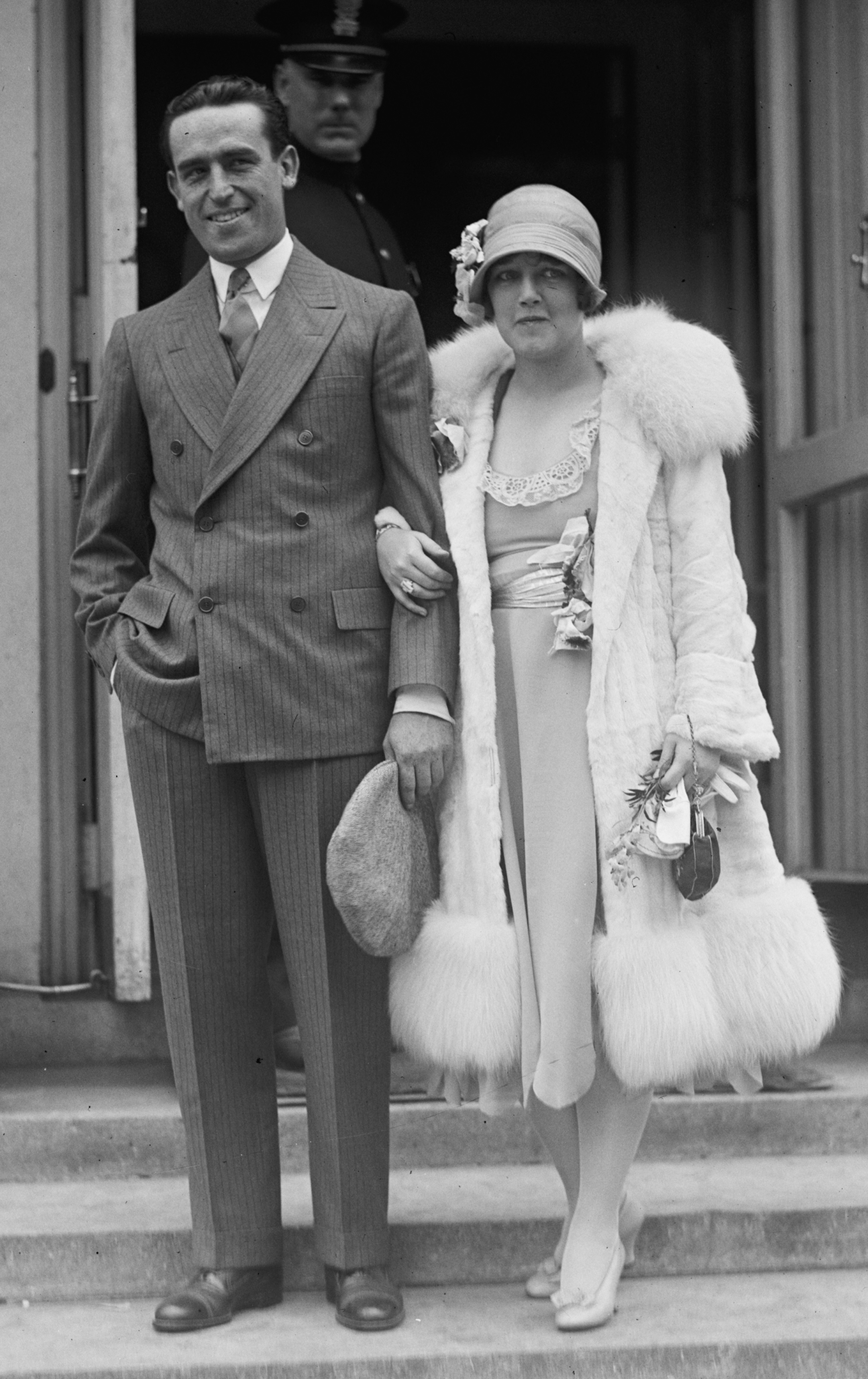
Actress Mildred Davis wearing coat made of ermine and arctic fox fur (1925)

1. Russia-Siberia

- Novaya Zemlya – best quality, luxuriant silky hair cover with high ground hairs, dense undercoat; snow-white.
- Yakutsk – slightly smaller, lush hair cover, silky soft; thin guard hairs, dense undercoat, pure white.
- Salekhard (formerly Obdorsk) – medium size; not so lush; significantly less silky, short guard hairs, dense undercoat; white, in part slightly cream-colored.
- Pechora – small; not lush, short guard hairs, little undercoat; white, sometimes a little bluish ("skimmed milk color").

2. Scandinavia – Spitsbergen, Northern Norway (Finnmark); similar to the Russian-Siberian ones, but considerably smaller and lower in quality.

3. Iceland-Greenland – small to medium-sized; medium density; lower in quality; partly white, partly yellowish; occasionally blackish guard hairs (gray-tipped); good for coloring.

4. North America – finer hair than those of the Russian-Siberian origin;

- Alaska and Yukon – large; dense, very silky; white; coarser hair in the ones from the West Coast.
- Hudson Bay – large; strong hair, very silky; mostly white, sometimes slightly yellowish.
- Labrador (Northeastern Canada) – very large; very silky; white; finest varieties: Whale River District, York Fort and Eskimo Bay.

Auction assortments (from 1988):

a) Russian, standardized

- Origins: Nowosemolsky, Kamchatka, Yeniseysk, Yakutsk, Salekhard (Obdorsk), Pechora, Mezensky District.
  - 1st type: full-haired
  - 2nd type: less full-haired
  - 3rd type: flat-haired
  - 4th type: flat-haired, slightly damaged, severely damaged, unusable

b) Hudson’s Bay and Annings Ltd., London

- Assortments: Canada, Soviet, Scandinavian
- Grades: I, II, III, IV, damaged
- Colors: pure white, slightly yellowish, whereby a distinction is made between greasy and stained (slightly yellowish). Greasy areas no longer remain completely white during finishing, but yellow.

c) The Royal Greenland Trade Department, Copenhagen

- Assortments: Greenland, Iceland
- Sizes: extra large, large, medium, small
- Colors: clear white, ivory, yellow belly, yellow, mixed.

The American trappers usually deliver the pelts with the skin side facing outwards because of the better protection of the hair, while in the wholesale trade white fox skins of all origins are offered with the fur side facing outwards because of the better valuation possibilities. (Note: The latter probably refers to already tanned pelts.)

Because of the uniform white coloring, defects in the white fox are more difficult to detect than in other types of fur. A technical report therefore provides detailed instructions for this:

“The pelt is placed over the left upper arm, first with the head and neck: the other larger part hangs down on the outside of the forearm. Then the part of the pelt resting on the forearm – the neck – is held up to the light to see whether the upper hair (guard hair) is evenly developed both in the middle of the pelt and on the sides.”

“Once this test has been carried out, the pelt is taken by the head with the right hand and slowly pulled down over the forearm to the buttocks. During this maneuver, the pelt is checked for the growth development of the upper hair in the manner indicated above.”

=== Emil Brass’ writings ===
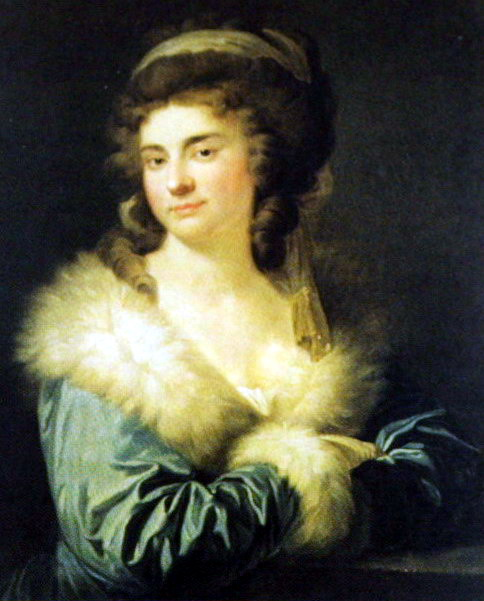
Julia Potocka (1764–1794) with arctic fox trimming, Poland

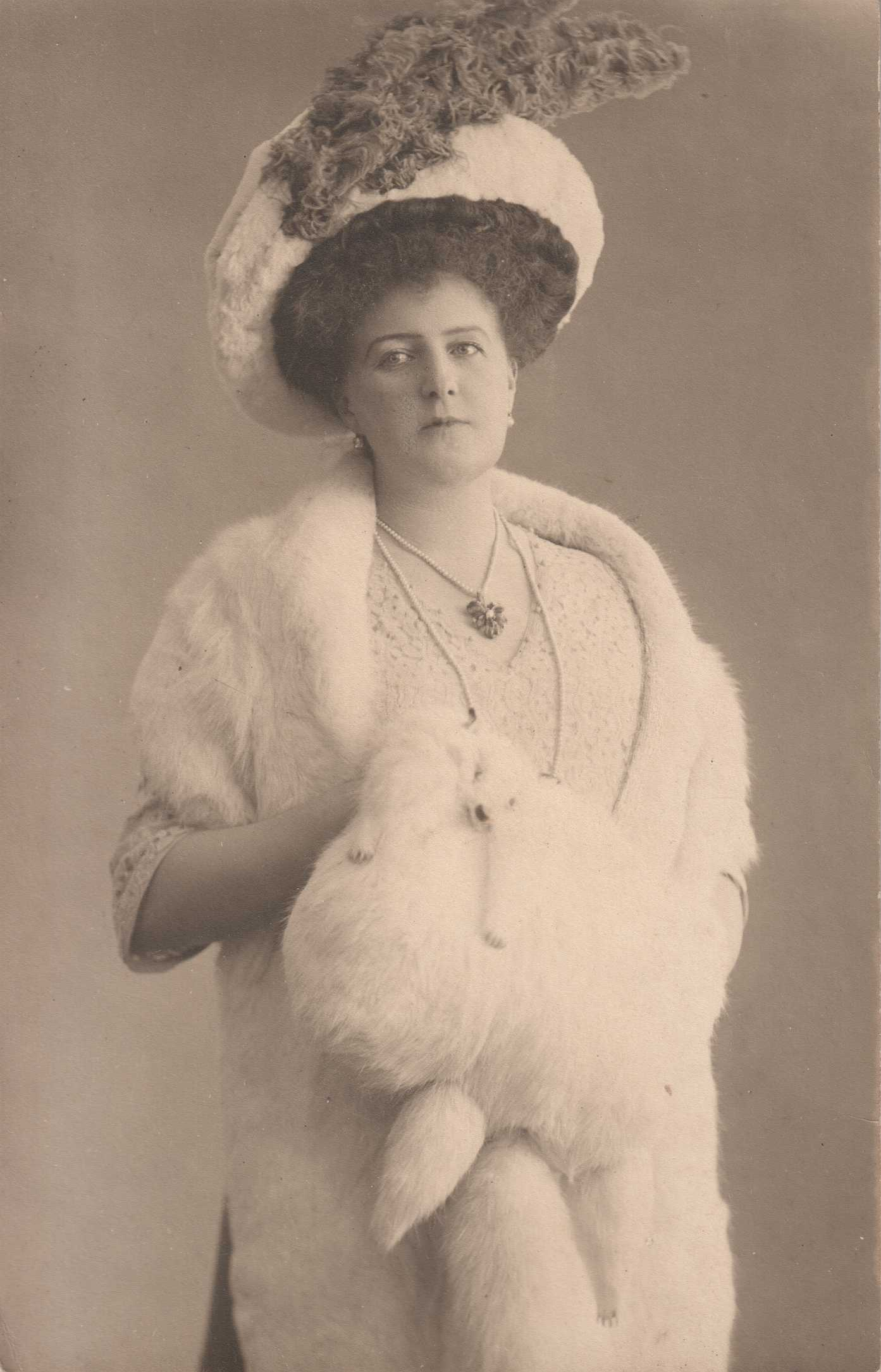
Lady with arctic fox stole and muff. A young fox appears to be peeking out from above the muff (Berlin, 1912)

Emil Brass, the fur trader from Berlin, wrote the following on arctic fox furs in 1911.

‘’Found on Svalbard, Greenland, Iceland and possibly the Faroe Islands, the arctic fox is considerably smaller than the american white fox, measuring 60 cm in length. The hair is dense, long and silky, the tail round and stocky with thick woolly hair. The Royal Greenlandic Trading Company brought 800 to 1000 furs to Copenhagen for auction each year, which were sorted into four categories, with only a few of the best types available. About the same quantity was probably delivered via the ports of Drontheim, Bergen, Tromsø, etc.

The fox, which was very numerous in Labrador at the time, is significantly larger than the Greenland fox, but also has very fine hair. The best come from the Little Whale River area.

A large white fox with somewhat coarser hair lives on the coast of the Hudson Bay and Barrengrounds. The fox on the west coast of Alaska is also large with coarse hair. On Kodiak Island there is a large white fox with coarse hair and a short, broad skull. A somewhat smaller species lives on Bering Island. In Vitus Bering's time there were “incredible numbers of both blue foxes and white foxes”.

The Hudson's Bay Company sold around 6000 to 8000 white fox pelts at auction every year. The Harmony Company in Labrador, run by the Moravian missionaries, sold around 1000 pelts a year via London. About 8000 to 10.000 North American pelts came from the Lampson Company, most of them from the West Coast. About the same amount came from the polar zone above Seattle and San Francisco, but they were mostly purchased in the USA. The white foxes on the Siberian Arctic coast were also very numerous. The best came from the Yeniseysk district, then from the Yakutsk district and the Olenyok and Kolyma districts. This species is very similar to that of Hudson Bay, the foxes are much larger than the Greenlandic pelts. Many of them have a yellowish coloration. At least 60 thousand pieces were traded every year, mostly via the fur trade at the Irbit fair and the fur fair in Nizhny Novgorod. Before 1911, the value of an arctic fox fur fluctuated between 20 and 60 marks, while that of a blue fox was between 60 and 200 marks.’’

== Processing ==
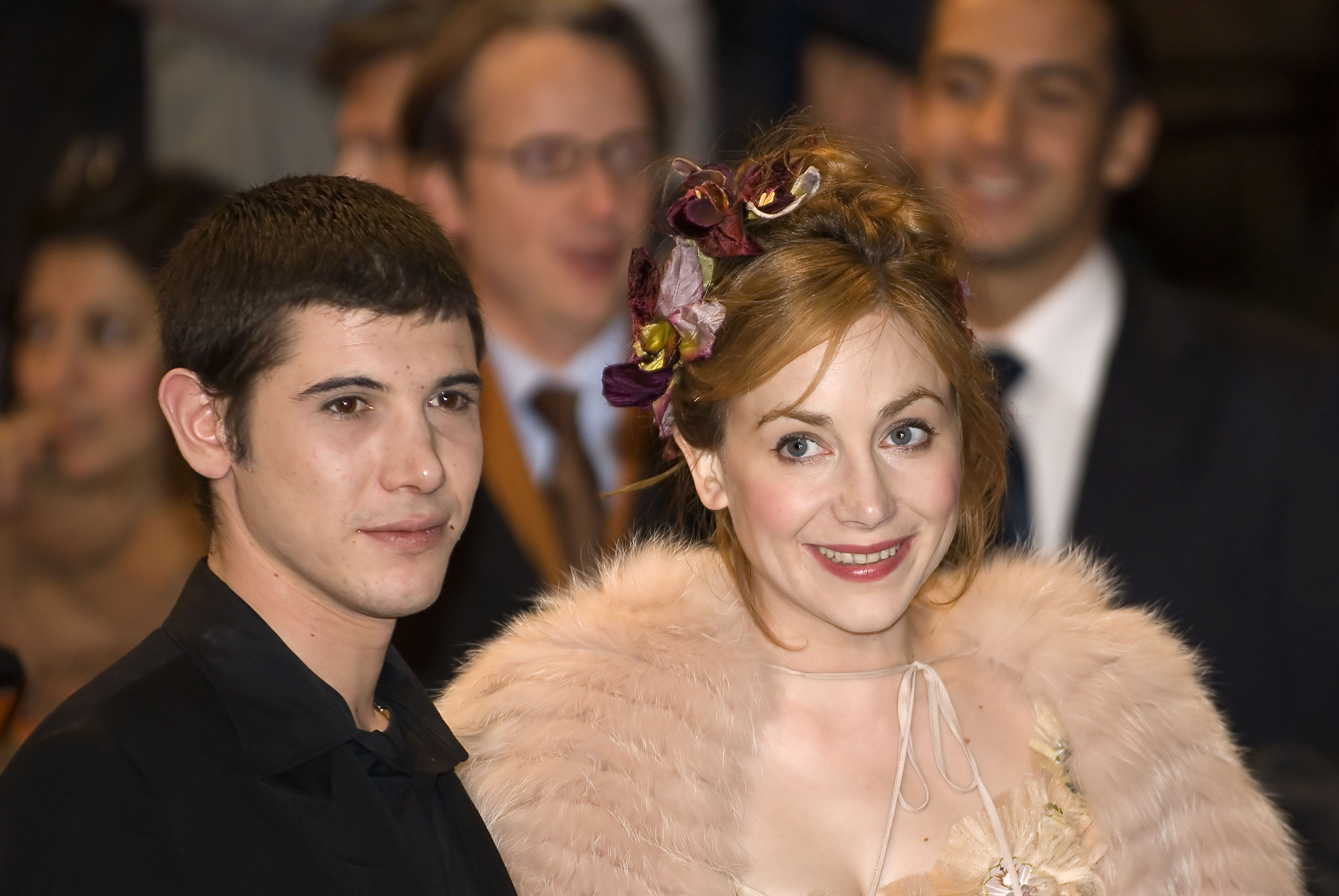
Julie Depardieu with a white fox collar (2006)

Arctic fox hair is significantly softer than that of the red fox, and the undercoat is matted in such a way that the skin is not visible when one blows on it. In the finished fur, even interposed strips of leather cannot be found if they have been sewn in using the traditional furrier's technique without tearing the hair fleece. This technique, known as leathering, was therefore used in particular for arctic fox furs. In addition to enlarging the fur surface, it also loosens up and beautifies the hair pattern. Due to the extremely dense, matted undercoat, there is no risk of the sewn-in leather strips being visible when the fur is folded, if done professionally. Arctic fox skins are relatively short, so that the once popular fox stoles could not be made from one pelt without leathering, especially if the underside was to be made of fur and not silk.

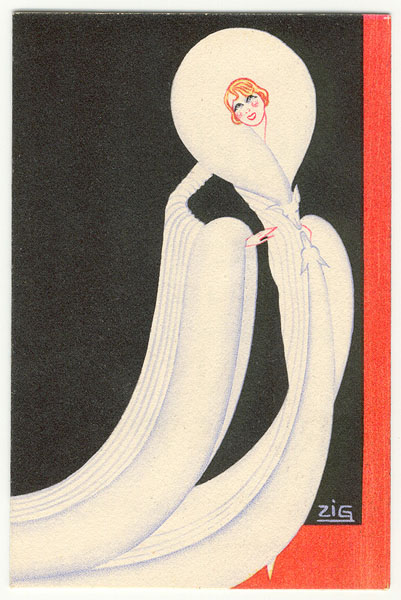
Advertisement of the Fourrures André Brunswick Company (ca. 1930)

If the arctic fox furs are not pure white or have already yellowed, they are bleached with optical brighteners. Goods intended for dyeing are also often brightened beforehand in order to achieve a clearer color and more regular assortments.

All types of white fox fur are either left white or dyed. In 1928, the dyeing of the often spotty pelts into a regular blue-gray is mentioned for “the wonderfully beautiful, sought-after spring and summer fur”, as well as the colors platinum, silver-gray, beige, orange and marten-like.

Slate gray white foxes were traded under the name “Slate fox”. If other fox species not classified as noble foxes were slate-dyed, they would have to be given an explanatory addition such as “red fox dyed slate” or “Mongolian fox dyed slate” or “country fox dyed slate” etc., according to an expert opinion of the Leipzig Chamber of Industry and Commerce from 1936.

The white, undyed fox furs are used to a particularly large extent for trimmings and small parts. They are also the classic material for festive furs, scarves, coats and jackets, and were formerly also used mostly for stoles, muffs and dress trimmings. However, dyed furs are also used for similar purposes, in addition to jacket and coat trimmings and hood trims.

In 1965, the consumption for a fur plate sufficient for a white fox coat was given as 14 to 16 larger or 17 to 20 smaller furs (so-called bodies, i.e. semi-finished products). This was based on a plate with a length of 112 centimetres (44 inches) and an average width of 150 centimetres (59 inches) and an additional sleeve part. This corresponds approximately to a fur material for a slightly flared coat in European size 46 (as of 2014). The maximum and minimum fur amount can result from the different sizes of the sexes of the animals, the age groups and their origin. Depending on the type of fur, these three factors have different effects.

As with most types of fur, every piece of fur from the arctic or white fox is used. Fox pieces, fox belly parts and fox paw plates are made from the fur scraps that fall off during processing. The main place for recycling the fur waste produced in Europe is Kastoria in Greece and the smaller town of Siatista nearby. Most of these semi-finished products are re-exported and then made into fur linings, jackets, coats and trimmings. The tails are used as pendants for key rings, bags, etc., and also as boas when fashionable.

== Data ==
In 1910, approximately 50.000 white fox pelts were traded from Asia, 30.000 from America and 3000 from Europe (6000 blue fox pelts from America, 4000 from Siberia and 1000 from Northern Europe).

In 1925, the annual production of white fox pelts was estimated as follows: 30.000 for North America, 25.000 for Asia and 10.000 for Europe. During that year, the U.S. Department of Agriculture issued 92 permits for the capture of white foxes in Alaska for breeding purposes and 33 permits for the killing of white foxes. There were a number of farms on the Seward Peninsula where the first attempts to keep white foxes in enclosures had begun.

Before 1944, the maximum prices for natural or dyed white fox furs were: best quality – RM 245; medium quality – RM 200; low quality – RM 75. As for blue foxes: best quality – RM 350; medium quality – RM 500.

In 1968, the total number of wild arctic foxes in the tundras of the Soviet Union was estimated at 200.000, and between 140.000 and 160.000 in North America.

In 1988, there were no exact figures available on the annual number. In North America at that time, 40.000 to 50.000 blue and white fox pelts from wild animals were found, of which an estimated half were blue foxes. Canadian statistics from 1985 to 1986 showed around 6000 pelts for its country. In 1987, 5000 pelts were offered at Russian auctions.

Annual production of Arctic fox pelts in Canada, average unit price (season 1945–46 to 1973–74):

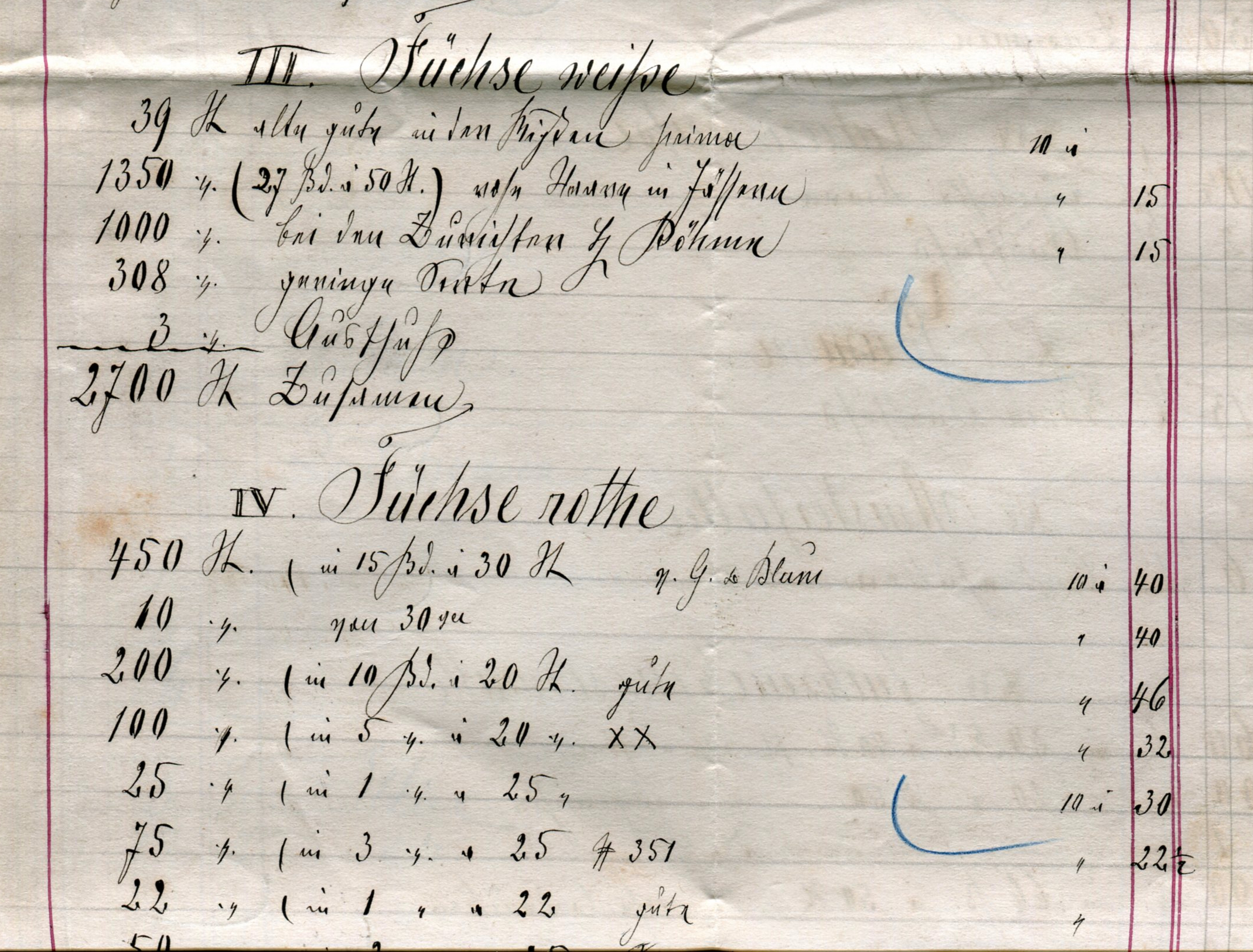
White and red fox pelts. Entry in the ledger of the Leipzig fur trader Soter Keskari in 1868

1945/46 to 1958/59
Season	Number	CA $
1945/46	27.169	22,83
1946/47	67.314	13,49
1947/48	55.423	11,12
1948/49	33.126	8,91
1949/50	19.775	8,45
1950/51	52.566	13,02
1951/52	53.654	8,16
1952/53	40.710	8,86
1953/54	36.370	11,10
1954/55	81.783	11,39
1955/56	31.728	13,14
1956/57	28.338	16.28
1957/58	31.890	15,26
1958/59	26.539	19,97

1959/60 to 1973/74
Season	Number	CA $
1959/60	14.457	24,44
1960/61	51.995	19,49
1961/62	45.358	11,27
1962/63	9.880	14,42
1963/64	32.447	14,92
1964/65	40.831	10,34
1965/66	11.656	10,34
1966/67	34.126	15,67
1967/68	29.683	11,37
1968/69	20.231	14,10
1969/70	7.363	13,91
1970/71	26.218	12,30
1971/72	33.655	11,40
1972/73	10.146	19,32
1973/74	53.415	32,34

Distribution of production in the Canadian territories and provinces in the seasons 1972-73 + 1973-74 and 2007 (2608 pelts) + 2008 (2514 pelts)

	Newfoundland Piece/Dollar	Nova Scotia Piece/Dollar	Québec Piece/Dollar	Ontario Piece/Dollar	Manitoba Piece/Dollar	Saskat- chewan Piece/Dollar	Alberta Piece/Dollar	Northwest Territories Piece/Dollar	Yukon Piece/Dollar	Nunavut Piece/Dollar
1972/73	/ -	8 / $26,00	921 / $26,00	/ -	63 / $27,4	7 / $26,43	37 / $942	8.975 / $18,32	2.264 / $80,00	
1973/74	12 / $18,25	34 / $34,50	12.531 / $39,00	18 / $ ?	61 / $36,33	19 / $31,84	136 / $43,16	40.555 / $30,21	2.950 / $100,73	
2007	0 / 0	0 / 0	358 / $19,86	6 / $13,00	20 / $19,55	0 / 0	0 / 0	346 / $20,75	0 / 0	1.878 / $21,32
2008	0 / 0	0 / 0	514 / $15,31	1 / $25,00	77 / $20,45	2 / $23,00	0 / 0	858 / $19,88	3 / $16,00	1.059 / $20,93
