= Blue fox fur =

Type of fox fur

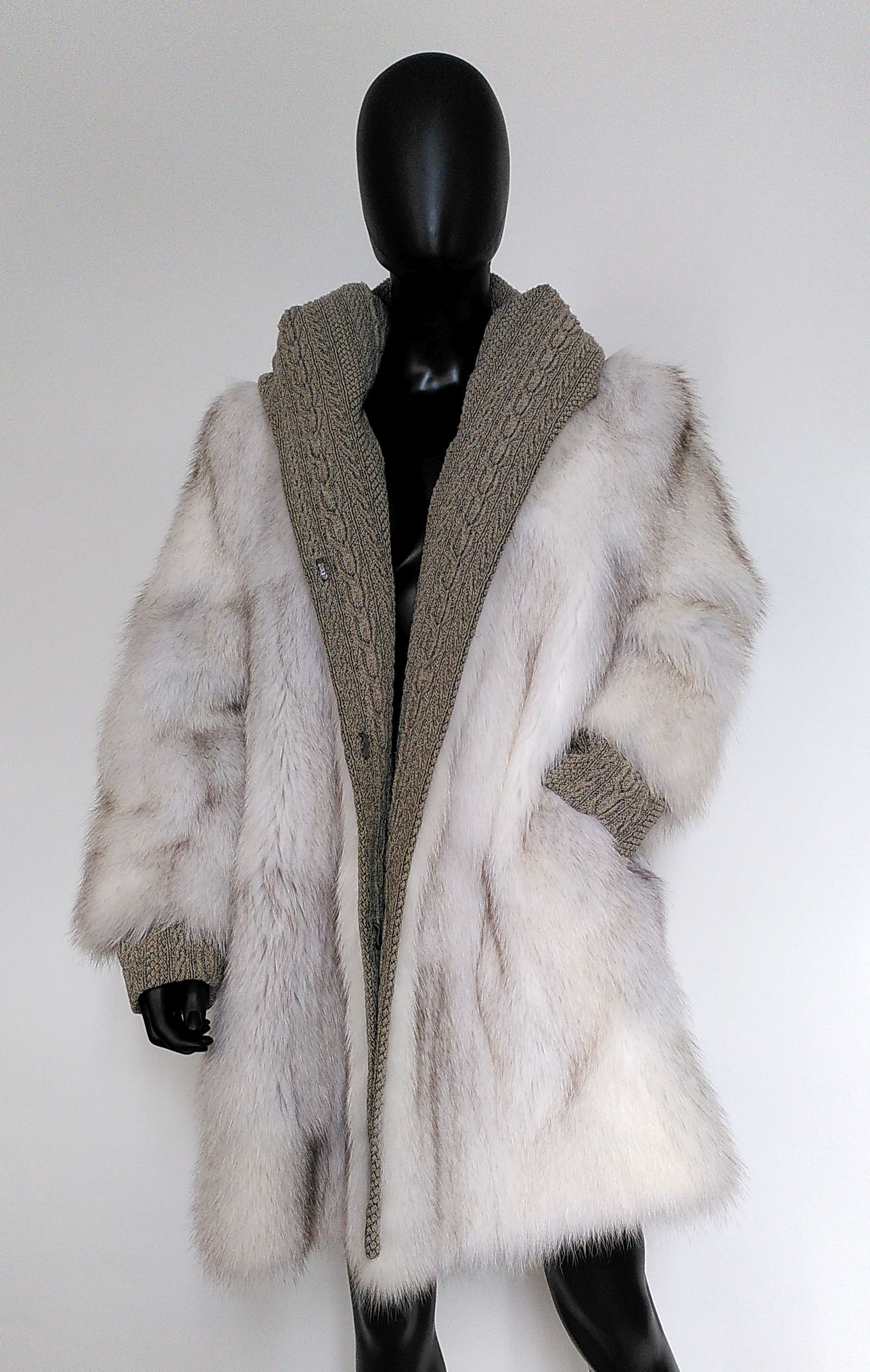
Blue fox coat with knitted fabric (Stephanie Metz, 2001)

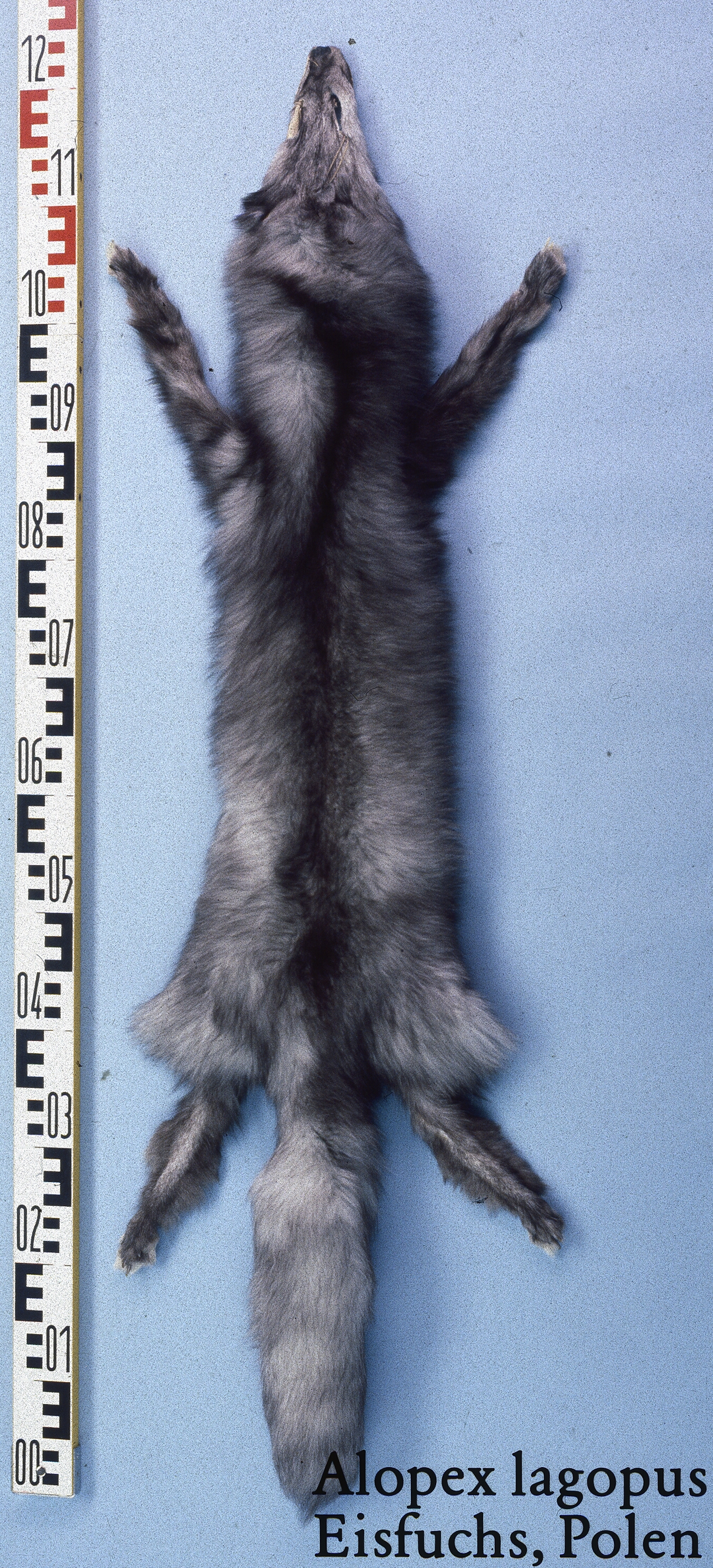
Blue fox pelt, Polish breeding

Blue fox fur is a type of fur obtained from the arctic fox (most specifically, its blue variant). The other of the two zoological morphs is called white fox, whose fur (the white fox fur) is also a fur commodity.

The blue fox, an arctic fox variant, is considered more valuable than the matted and smaller fur of the white fox. Almost white blue foxes with only a slightly darker middle of the fur are traded as shadow foxes; Pure white fur is usually sold to the end consumer as white fox, like that of the arctic fox.

In the jargon of the fur trade industry, the dark, bluish winter furs of all types are referred to as "blue", not just those of the "blue" foxes, in contrast to "red", the lighter and therefore usually less valued color variants of the same fur type.

The fur trade classifies the blue fox fur among the so-called noble fox furs, such as the silver fox fur, the arctic fox fur and the cross fox fur.

== Fur ==
The blue fox pelts from wild-caught specimens are around 50 to 65 cm (19.7 to 25.6 in) long, and the tails are 25 to 35 cm (9.8 to 13.7 in) long. The pelts of male foxes are only slightly larger than those of female ones. Pelts from breeding farms are considerably larger.

The long and very silky hair varies from blue-brown and lightest "café au lait" to light blue-grey and deep dark brown, sometimes almost black with shades of rusty red and loamy-dirty, sometimes with silver hair. The summer coat is dark black-brown and usually slightly browner than the winter coat.

The moulting process often begins towards the end of the rut period and is particularly visible on the coats of pregnant females. The first hair falls out on the shoulders. The winter coat begins to form in August.

The fur of young blue and white foxes from the wild is initially completely dark; Russian fur hunters call this age group nornik ("cave dweller"). The late summer pelts are lighter on the sides, belly and legs, while the dark gray shade remains on the neck, shoulders and back, where it creates a cross-like pattern. These pelts are known as krestowatik ("cross-bearers").

In 1960, the first cases of white foxes being born in Poland were recorded, and their systematic breeding was pursued further. Such animals are also said to have occurred in Norway. The young foxes that appeared in Poland were probably two genetically different mutations. After just a few days, the two mutations were easy to distinguish, one remained pure white, the other had the characteristic markings and color of the platinum fox.

Farmed blue foxes have a completely different hair structure to their wild ancestors. The wool fleece is thinner and the hair thickness is greater. The color is also different. The base of the coat is practically white and only tinged with gray in the lower area. The guard hairs' ends show a more or less bluish-brown coloration.

In the trade, individuals caught in the wild are divided according to their origin:

- Russia-Siberia: medium-sized, medium density; very silky. Light-colored, partly silvered. About the same as the Greenland type.
- Arctic: from northern Canada and western Greenland. Medium-sized, silky and sometimes silvery in light and dark colors.
- Icelandic: small, light gray, partly woolly, almost milky, bluish gray undercoat. Back and tail often intermixed with white guard hair. Iceland provides the weaker in terms of quality, and Greenland the stronger ones.
- Greenlandic: almost violet shimmering, light with silky guard hair. Usually with distinctive silvering. Profusely hairy belly part.
- Alaska: Hudson Bay and Labrador ones are large, very dense (full-haired) and silky. Dark and little silvered. Slightly coarser and woollier in hair, yet blue.

The durability coefficient for fine fox fur is given as 50 to 60 percent. (Note: The comparative values (coefficients) given are the result of comparative testing by furriers and fur traders with regard to the degree of apparent wear (usage). The numbers are not unambiguous; in addition to subjective observations of durability in practice, each individual case is influenced by tanning and finishing as well as numerous other factors. A more precise figure could only be determined on a scientific basis. The classification was made in steps of 10 percent each. The most durable fur types based on practical experience were set at 100 percent.) When fur animals are divided into the fineness categories, among which are silky, fine, medium-fine, coarser and hard, blue fox hair is classified as fine.

Only the winter pelts of both blue and white foxes are traded. Hunting and trapping of young specimens in their summer coat is prohibited. General hunting and trapping bans for arctic foxes have existed in Sweden since 1928, in Norway and Finland since 1930.

== Trade and history ==
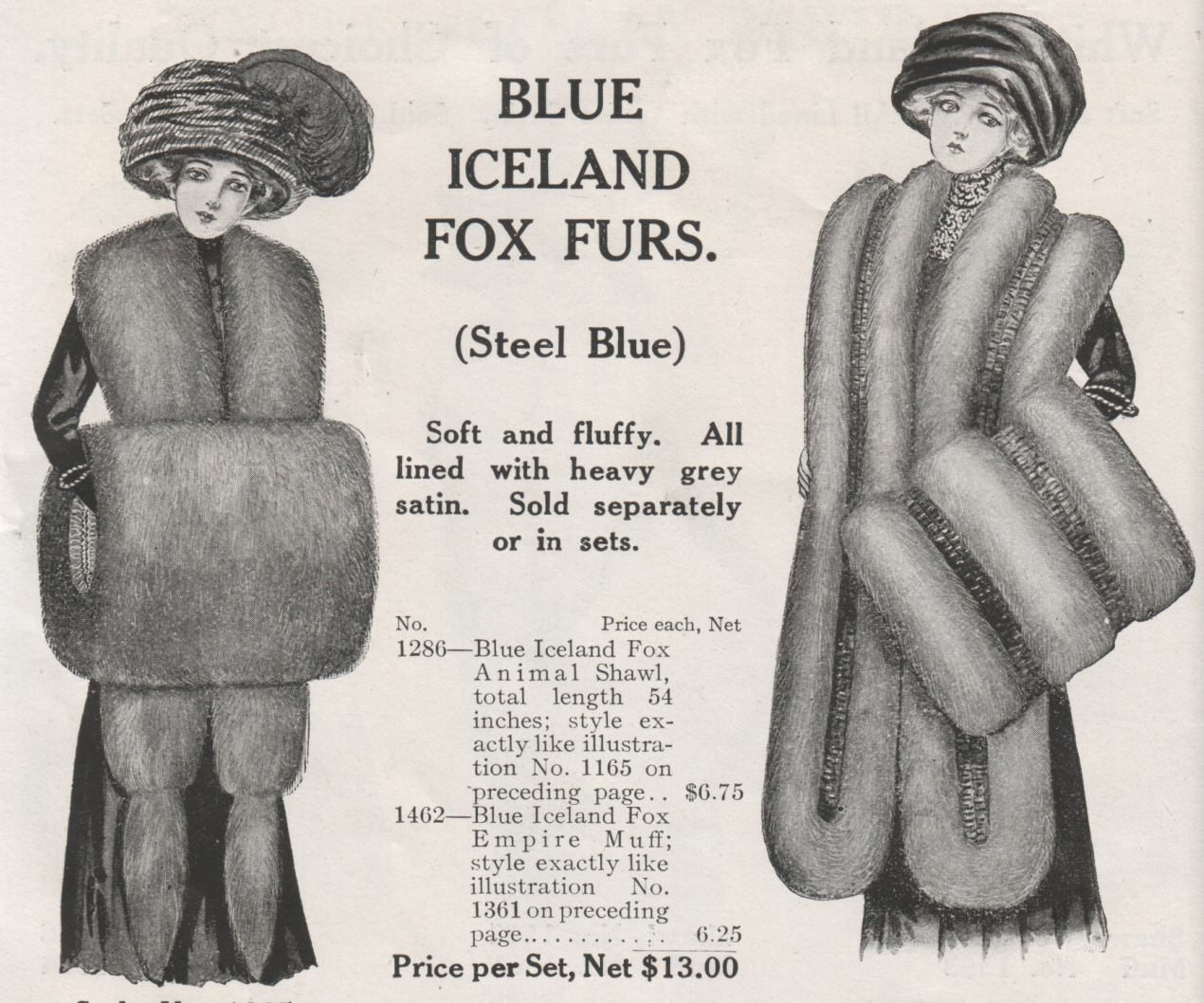
Lush blue fox shawls and muff (from an American brochure, 1910)

The fur trader Stepan Glotov managed to reach the coast of Alaska via the islands of Unalaska and Umnak in 1759. Others soon followed to exploit the fabulous wealth of furs, which far exceeded that of Siberia. The main beneficiary was the merchant Gregor Schelechow from Okhotsk. From his very first visit, he brought back 17 tons of walrus teeth, 8 tons of fish glue, 2000 beaver pelts, 4000 sea otter pelts and 6000 blue fox pelts.

The wife of Henry II of France, Catherine de Medici (1519–1589), owned a very expensive blue fox fur coat during the peak price period of blue fox fur. Blue fox fur has always been considered more valuable than white fox fur; only in the 1920s did white fox fur also experience a heyday as a glamorous piece of clothing. In some areas, the targeted hunting of the blue fox led to the former balance shifting in favor of the white fox. Around 1742, almost only blue foxes were captured on Bering Island, which led to their population being destroyed "down to a meagre remnant", while the white foxes remained almost unharmed (according to Georg Steller). The same shifts caused by this targeted hunting can also be observed in the Siberian Arctic Ocean region. One of the areas most populated by arctic foxes is the west coast of Greenland. In the past, 7 white foxes were caught for every 10 blue foxes. In 1961 it was stated: "For some time now, however, the ratio has been 5:5. The white fox has always predominated on the east coast. Catch result is 2 blue foxes to 10 white foxes".

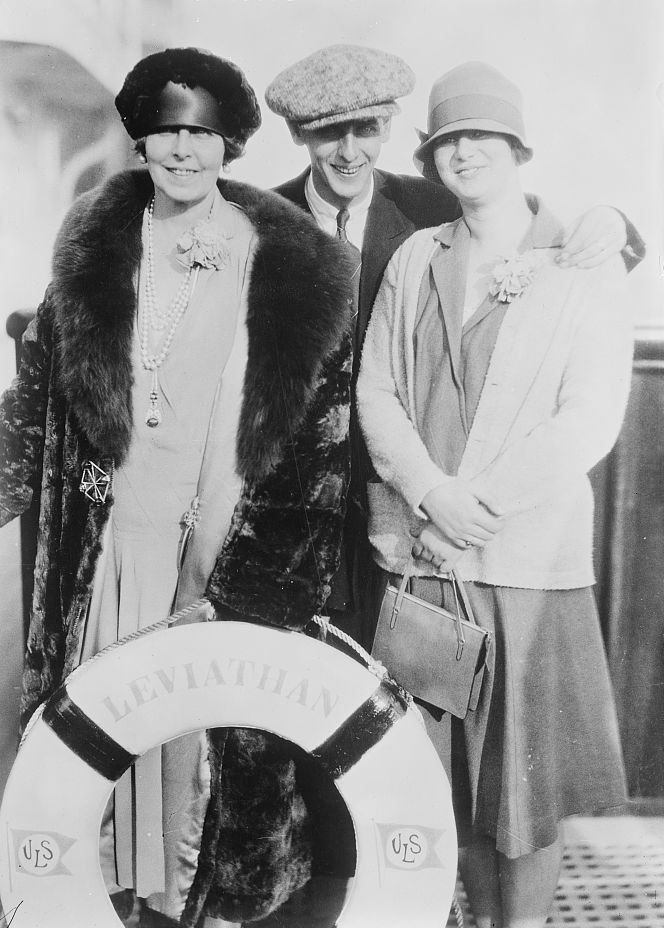
Marie of Edinburgh, Queen of Romania (1875–1938) in a mole coat with blue fox shawl collar

The Russian Arctic Research Institute observed on the Commander Islands that "big" blue fox years, with unusually high numbers of animals, occur about every four years. In 1858, a Russian decree ordered the killing of all white foxes while restricting the hunting of blue foxes.

The first commercial interest in blue fox fur emerged in 1835 when Russians brought blue foxes to Kiska Island in the Aleutian Islands, Amilia Island and the Cascade Mountains to let them develop there, initially in the wild. In 1885, the Semidi Propagation Co. of Kodiak began farm breeding with ten pairs of wild animals living on the Pribilof Islands, which were brought to Chowiet Island, later known as South Semidi Island, off the coast of Alaska for breeding. The company itself was not financially successful, but by supplying other islands with breeding stock, it laid the foundation for blue fox breeding in Alaska. The actual upswing began in 1916, after the temporary reduction in demand caused by the First World War.

In 1911, Emil Brass reported on blue foxes on the Pribilof Islands of St. Paul and St. George, among others. The native foxes kept free-range there are "large and well colored. The animals are properly bred there and only the best specimens are allowed to breed .... As a result, the breed has been significantly improved so that the pelts fetch a good price. Around 500 animals are now killed there every year. Blue foxes are now also bred on various other islands on the coast of Alaska in so-called fox farms, for which the land is leased from the government for a very nominal sum. These ventures are paying off very well. About 3000 to 4000 blue foxes from the Alaskan coast are now traded to London every year, but this number is expected to increase considerably soon. Also from northern Siberia come blue foxes of good quality and color, large pelts, but somewhat dull in color. I have not been able to determine the exact number, but there are probably no more than a few thousand a year. Almost all of the pelts coming from the polar region to Seattle and San Francisco stay in the country. The value of a blue fox is 60 to 200 RM per piece, depending on the quality."

In 1926, there were six groups of Alaska Islands on which blue foxes were bred. The first group was formed by the islands southeast of Alaska or the Alexander Archipelago; the second group was on Prince William Sound, the third in Lower Cook Inlet, the fourth in the Kodiak-Afognak District, the fifth on the Alaska Peninsula itself and the sixth on the Aleutian Islands. At that time, however, it was already becoming apparent that enclosure breeding was probably less costly than island breeding. Among other things, breeders were not only losing foxes to birds of prey, but it became apparent that the foxes were good swimmers and disappeared to nearby islands or the mainland.

In 1801, Buse wrote about blue foxes: "Their rarity makes them worthy of appreciation. Their hair reflects a beautiful shine." And about their use and value: "...White ones are used to lining Hungarian furs. ... Blue ones are used to make furs and lapels for ladies. Because of their high price, they are only used by rich and distinguished people .... The current value of these furs is 10 to 25 thalers per piece."

In parts of northern America, blue fox pelts were still "almost a kind of fur money in a barter trade with the native Eskimos" around 1900. In Thule, Greenland, Inuit women still wore full-body furs made of blue fox in the 1920s, which were made of 14 pelts and were worth the "considerable" value of 7000 Danish crowns at the time.

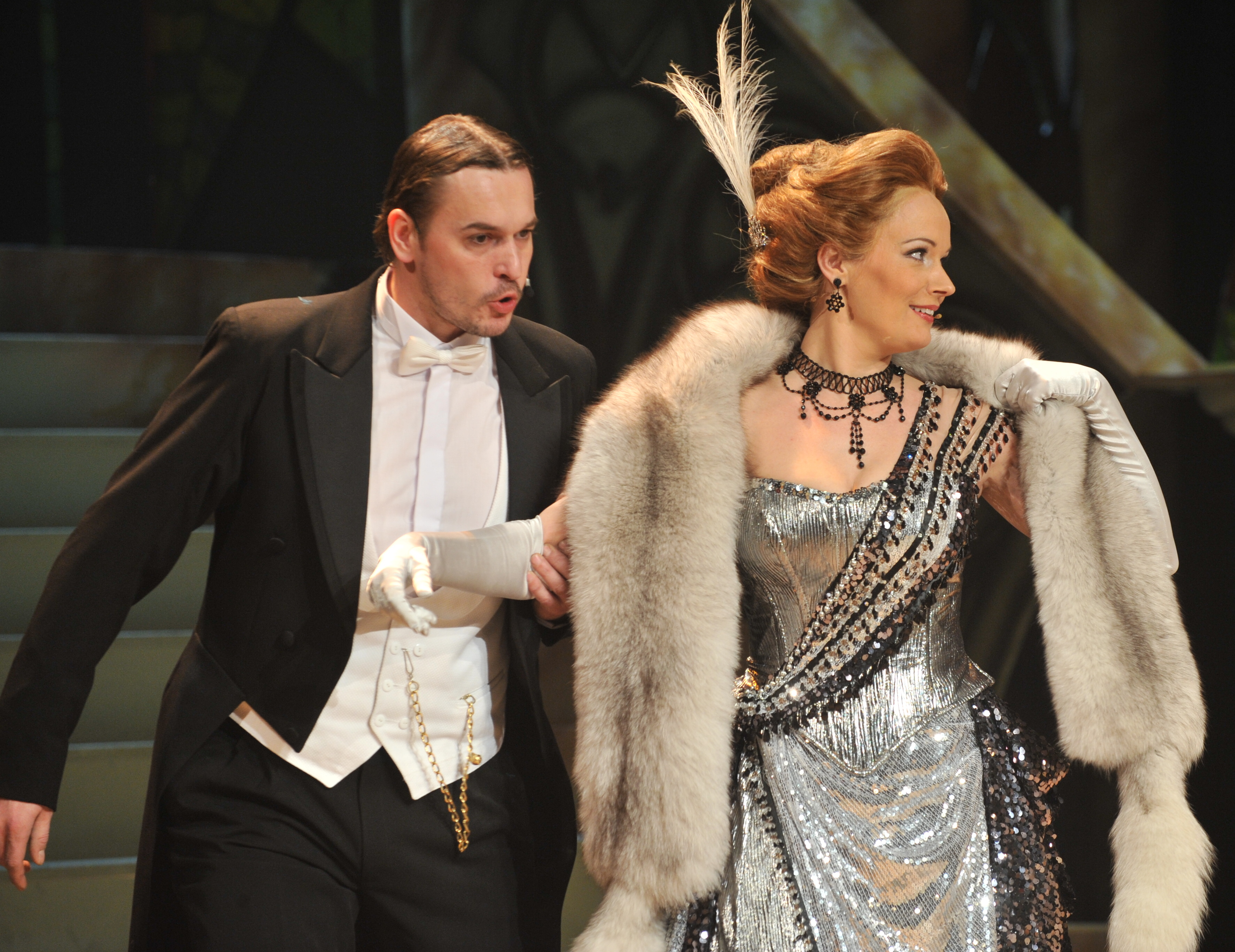
Blue fox stole in the musical "Hello Dolly!" (Czech Republic, 2010)

Almost at the same time as the silver foxes, blue foxes also began to be bred (1890s), but breeding did not reach the same level until the Second World War. The Italian fashion writer Irene Brin recalls the appearance of Marlene Dietrich at the bar in Colony, dressed in the first red fox coat to be seen in public: "It was only a few years ago, in 1932, that people began to wear light-colored foxes, which in spring replaced the traditional mole stoles, pine marten stoles or stone marten scarves: and now everyone wants two whole foxes with their muzzles side by side and their paws tied together, while the ladies with greater ambitions inaugurate their first silver fox collars."

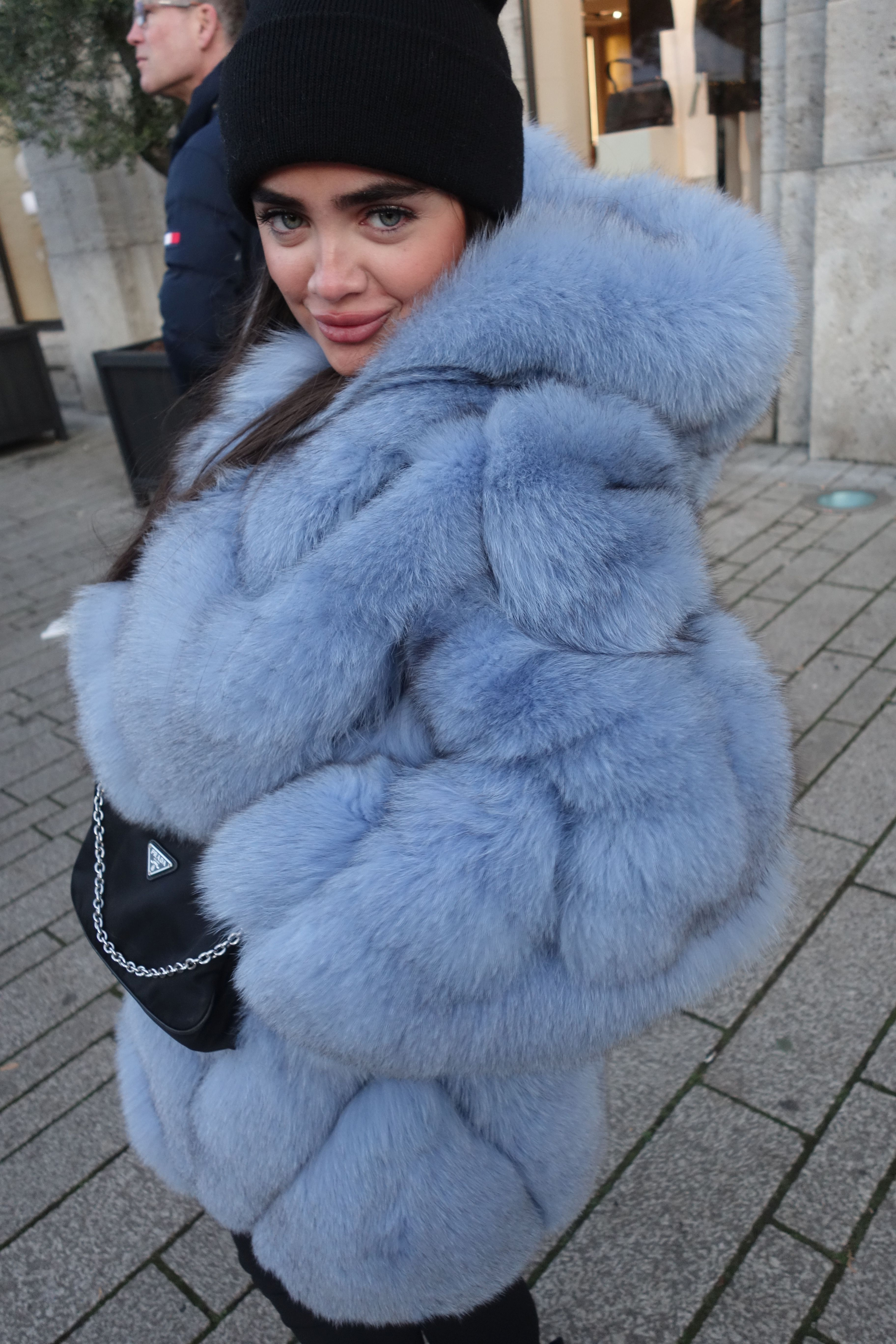
Dyed blue fox fur coat (2024)

Blue fox breeding developed very slowly, the relatively large supply from the wild kept the price of fur low, and despite larger litters, breeding proved more difficult than that of the silver fox.

Today, the furs come mainly from Scandinavia, Poland, the former Soviet Union area and North America.

With the beginning of the Second World War in 1939–40, fashion turned away from longhair fur (in Germany only at the beginning of the currency reform in 1948) and the era of the karakul and later the mink began. It was not until around the 1960s that blue fox breeding began to increase again

As with other types of fur, the appetite for blue fox fur has changed over the years. Before 1940, there was still a demand for particularly dark, technically blue, foxes. In 1970, Fritz Schmidt described the new type of fox: "A fox that is well covered from the head to the end of the tail with soft and pure-colored guard hairs, which must have a black tail tip for the desired contrast effect. Its color ranges from very light to deep dark blue or blue-grey with a white or strongly blue-toned undercoat, and a mostly widespread silvering completes the soft, silky character of this coat." The Greenland type came closest to these ideas, with a purposeful crossbreeding of wild and bred animals, initially of purely Greenlandic origin. The pure silver comes from the Icelandic fox, the abundant, short, smooth and soft upper hair and the dense, strong undercoat from the Svalbard fox and the clear blue color from the Jan Mayen fox. In addition, the body length has now increased by 15 to 20 centimetres (6 to 8 in) due to constant breeding selection.

In America, the Alaska type is usually bred, in Norway and Finland a very light-colored blue fox type, in Sweden the Alaska and Greenland types (as noted in 1988). Blue foxes from Norway have been traded as a separate fox type under the name Norwegian Blue Fox since 2017. They originate from a cross between the Alaskan blue fox and the Arctic blue fox. The type is characterized by short, blue and black-tipped upper hair with a clear contrast to the dense and short undercoat, which is quite light-colored, slightly shaded blue at the bottom.

High-quality and large blue fox pelts come from Poland, they are similar to the good Norwegian ones. Because the guard hair is often particularly dense, they are perfect for dyeing. In 1988, the range consisted of one third each of extra large, large, and medium or small pelts. The main colors were pale, medium, dark and extra dark. Compared to other breeds, there were only a few sub-varieties.

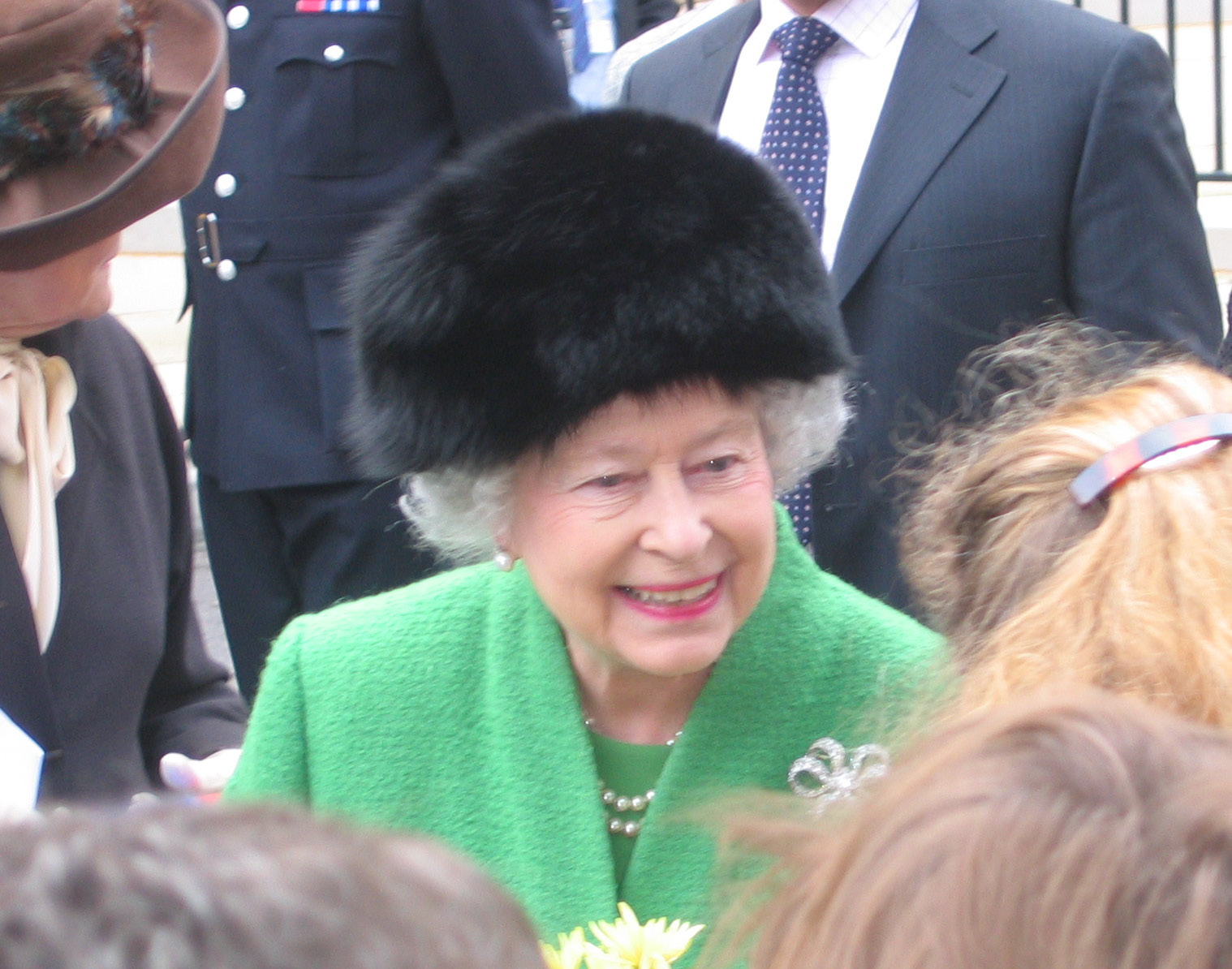
Queen Elizabeth II with cap made of dyed blue fox (2005)

At the auctions, fox furs are offered in various sizes, qualities and colors:
Polish and Scandinavian	Russian	Icelandic and Greenlandic
Sizes:		
00 = over 106 cm	0 = over 80 cm	1 = more than 85 cm
0 = 97–106 cm	1 = 79–79,9 cm	2 = 75–85 cm
1 = 88–97 cm	2 = under 75 cm	3 = 65–75 cm
2 = 79–88 cm		4 = under 65 cm
3 = 70–79 cm		
4 = under 70 cm		
Types:		
A1, A2, A3; B1, B2, B3; C1, C2, C3 selected, damaged and only for Polish: Syrena 1 and 2 (special quality)	I, II, III, IV damaged	
Colors:		
extra extra dark, extra dark, medium pale, extra pale	dark, medium, pale, extra pale	light silvery, medium silvery, dark silvery, light medium, dark, pale, mixed
The center back strip of a pelt (grotzen) is the darkest part.

== Processing ==
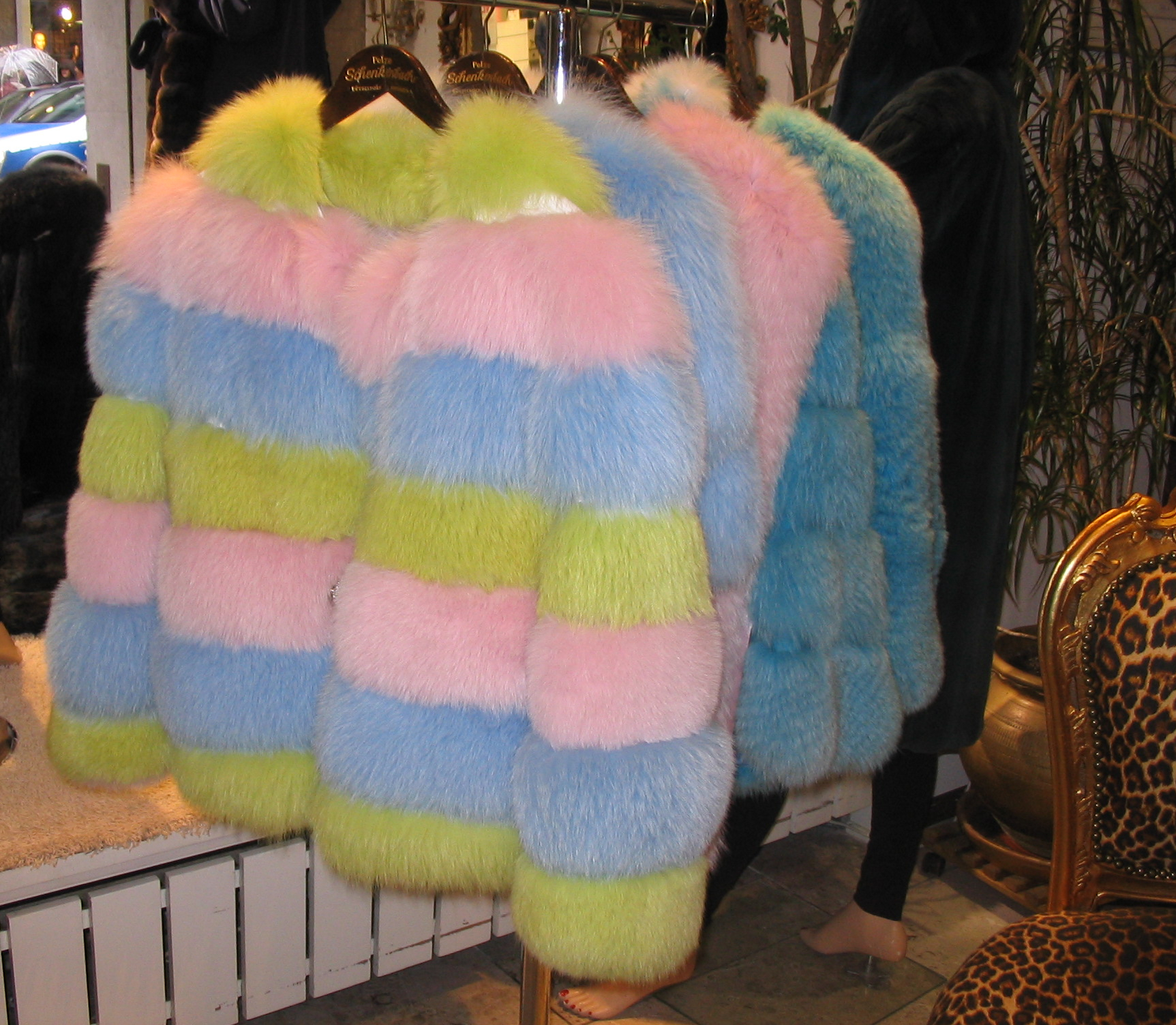
Jackets made from several different dyed blue fox pelts (2011)

As with other foxes, the dressing is carried out with the fur removed in a rounded manner and not cut open.

In addition to its natural color, the blue fox fur is perfect for dyeing in all colors, mainly for the textile industry in the respective fabric colors of the season, due to its light coloration, up to white, and the regular fur surface. Single dyeings in plain colors and natural tones as well as all fancy shades up to black can be produced as desired. Lead-based double dyeings allow for a play of colors between the upper hair and undercoat. For middle range shades using metal complex dyes, the required heat resistance is achieved by chrome tanning of leather. Dark shades can be produced with good coverage using oxidation dyes, usually based on a chrome potash stain. Pastel variations are created using acid dyes from the Alizarin group by reason of lightfastness.

Blueing, also known as white dyeing, should only be carried out to a limited extent. When exposed to strong light, especially in the high mountains, the hair fades or yellows relatively quickly and then contrasts unattractively with the original shade of the garments that have not come into contact with the light. Entirely natural products are considerably less sensitive to sunlight.

Blue fox-like refinements were found on red fox, white fox, American opossum, hare, rabbit, flying squirrel and lynx fur.

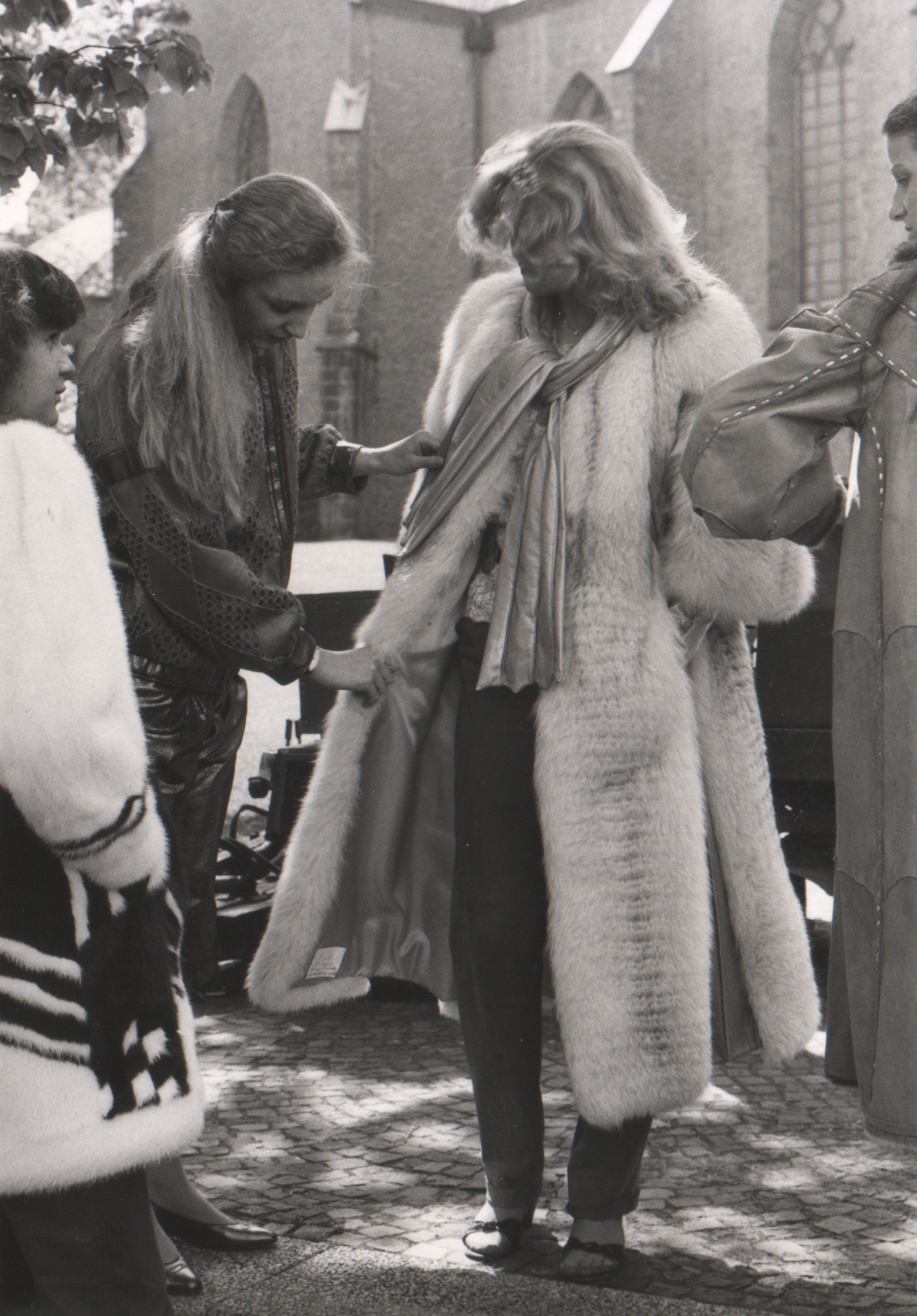
Dyed blue fox coat mixed with other type of fur, metallic nappa leather (1980)

The processing does not differ significantly from that of other noble fox species, just as all the processing and usage of silver fox fur and arctic fox fur for the production of the once so popular animal-shaped fur scarves.

Blue fox pelts are processed into all types of fur clothing, mainly for trimmings, scarves, muffs and fur stoles. In Western Europe, the pelts are still mainly used for trimmings on garments and small items, until around the 1970s more frequently, today still occasionally for coats and jackets, and since the introduction of the fur sewing machine before 1900, often in the fur-saving taping technique.

The shape of the pelts can be altered as desired with the so-called letting out. Narrow V- or A-shaped cuts are used to cut the pelts to any desired length at the expense of the width, right down to a floor-length evening coat.

In times when sheared and plucked furs were fashionable, foxes were repeatedly sheared for this look without much commercial success. As with other types of fur, sheared fox furs are now usually given the name "velvet" or "soft", i.e. velvet fox or soft fox. A shearing height of around 14 to 18 millimetres (0.55 to 0.70 in) is recommended for blue fox.

In 1965, the consumption for a fur plate sufficient for a blue fox coat was given as 14 to 16 larger or 17 to 20 smaller furs (so-called bodies, i.e. semi-finished products). This was based on a plate with a length of 112 centimeters (44 in) and an average width of 150 centimeters (59 in) and an additional sleeve part. This corresponds approximately to a fur material for a slightly flared coat in European size 46 (as of 2014). The maximum and minimum fur amount can result from the different sizes of the sexes of the animals, the age groups and their origin. Depending on the type of fur, these three factors have different effects.

As with most types of fur, every piece of fur from the blue fox is used. Fox pieces, fox belly parts and fox paw plates are made from the fur scraps that fall off during processing. The main place for recycling the fur waste produced in Europe is Kastoria in Greece and the smaller town of Siatista nearby. Most of these semi-finished products are re-exported and then made into fur linings, jackets, coats and trimmings. The tails are used as pendants for key rings, bags, etc., and also as boas when fashionable.

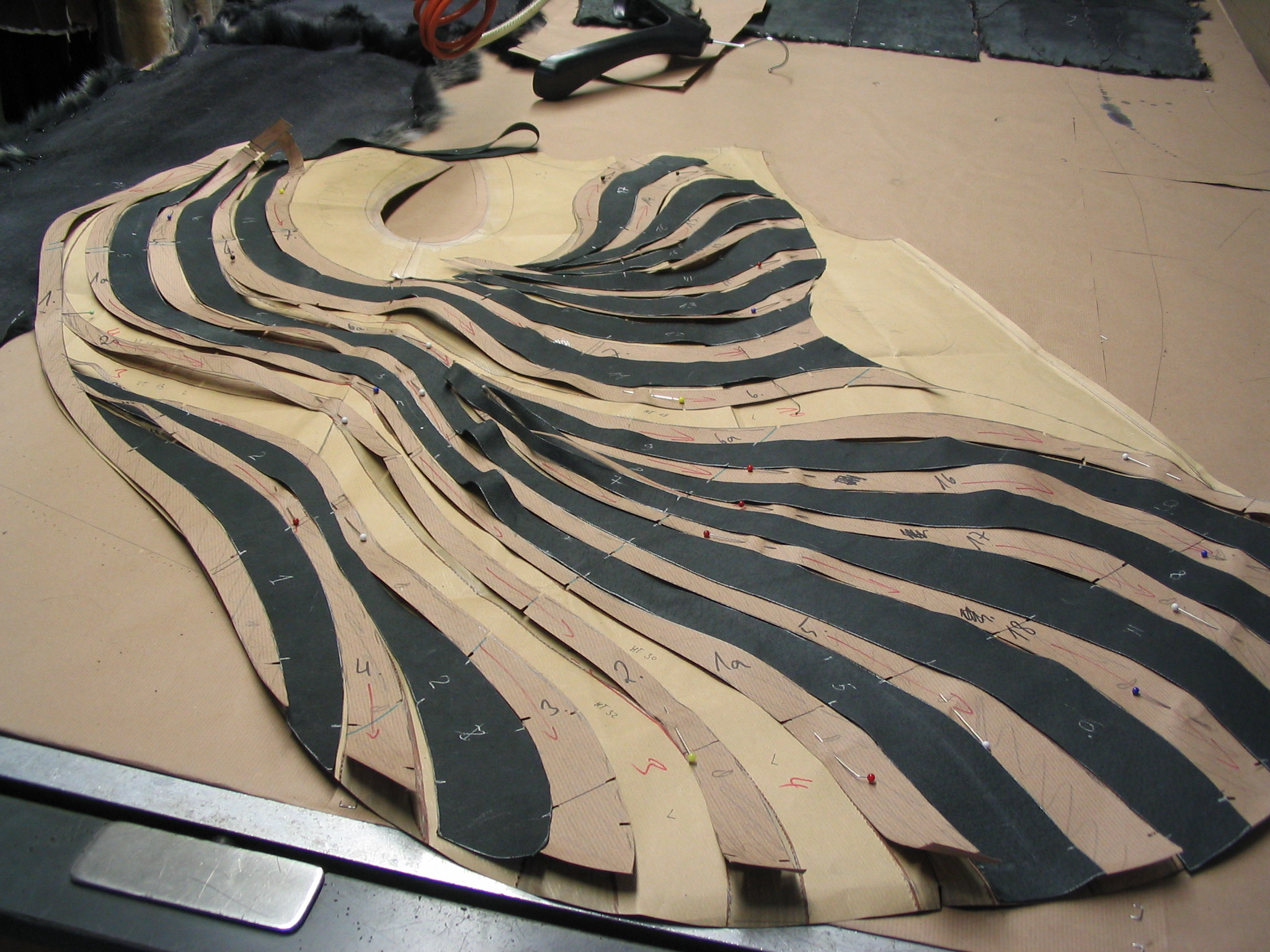
Preparing a blue fox coat …

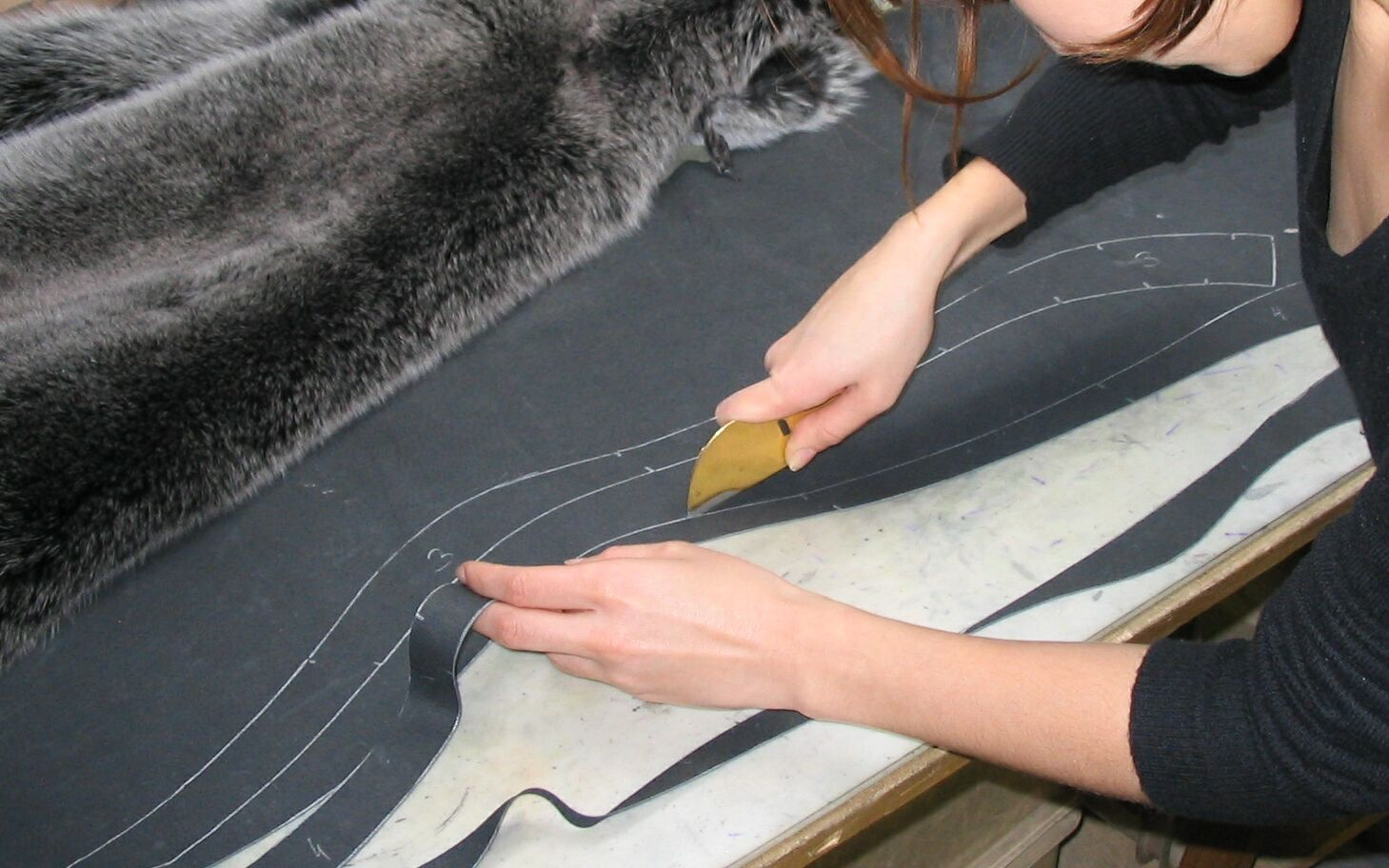
… for a designer competition …

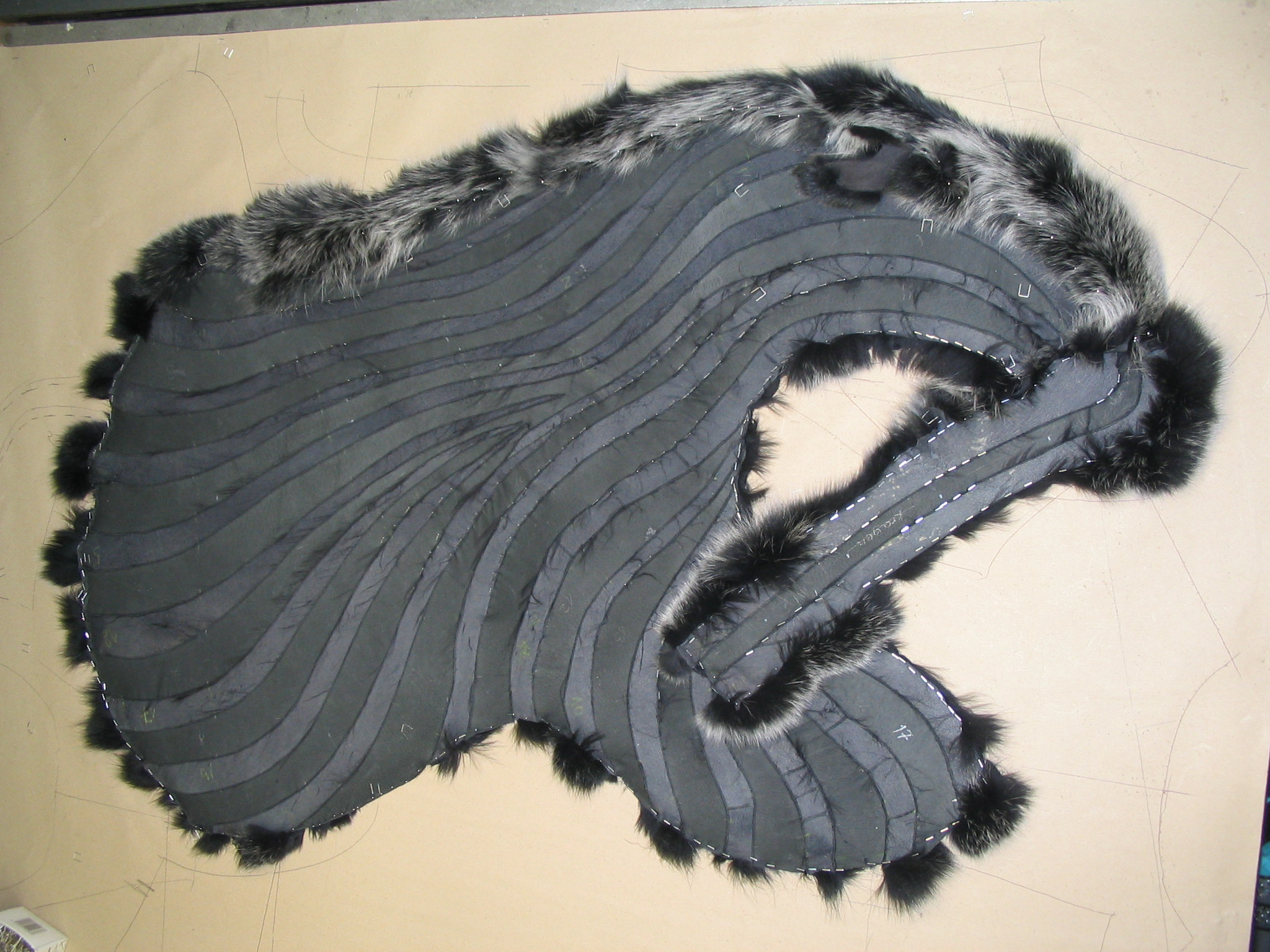
…in the occasion of the 2009 fur fair in Milan, Italy.

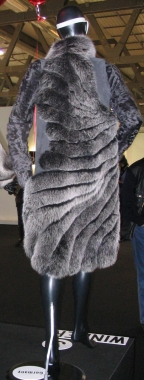
Back view of the taped coat.

== Data ==
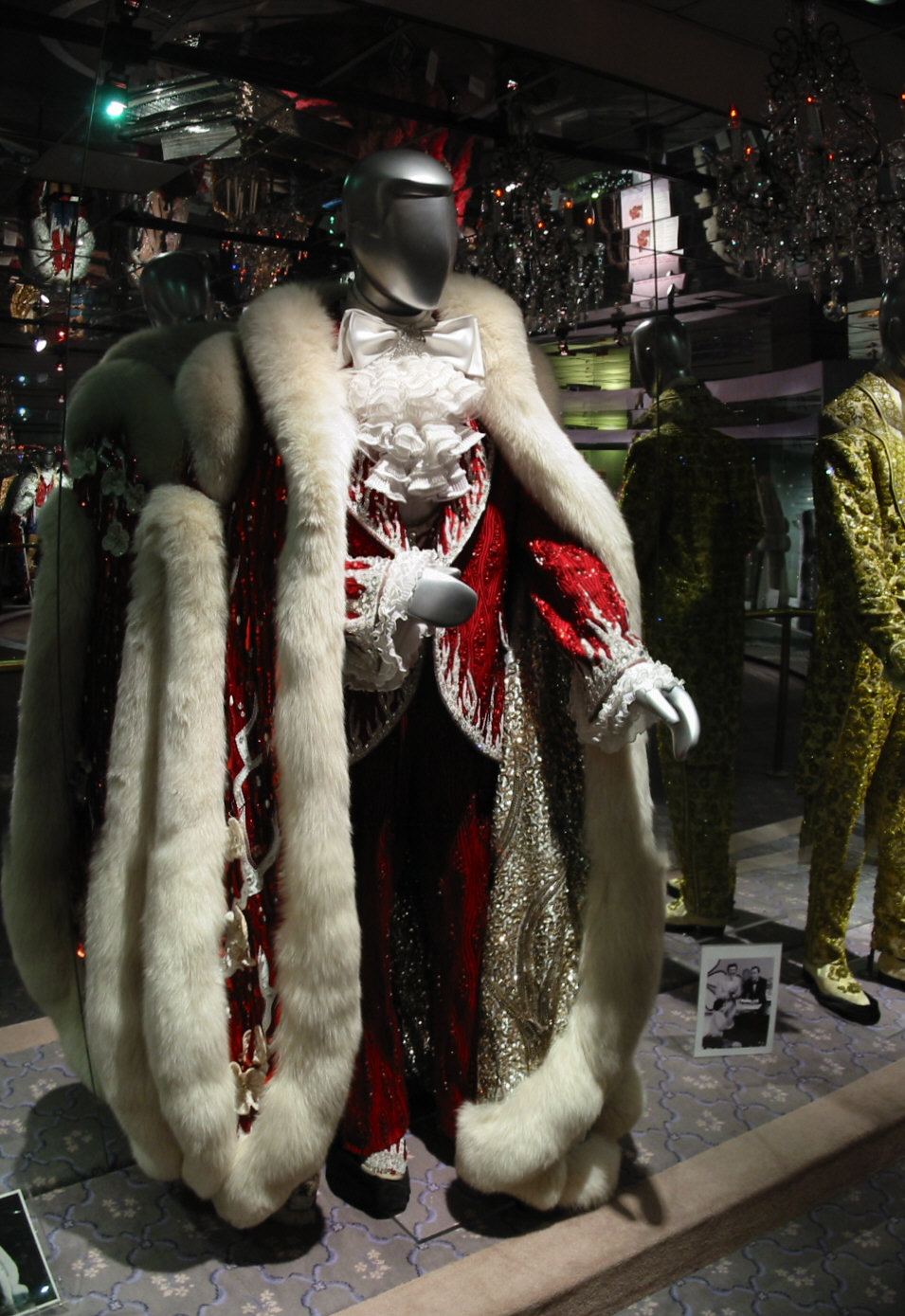
Christmas costume of the American entertainer Liberace (1981)

- In 1927, blue fox pelts were listed separately in Canadian statistics for the first time, with 119 pieces. They achieved an average price of $21.18. The next year there were 208 pieces at the average price of $23.60.
- In 1986, with a population of around 140,000 to 160,000 animals in North America, the wild catches resulted in an annual fur harvest of 40,000 to 50,000 pelts, of which around 15,000 came from Canada. No figures were known for the USSR at the time.
- In 2007, the following quantities were traded from Scandinavia. Blue fox – 1,214.000 pelts; blue shadow/white blue fox – 150,500 pelts; silver blue fox (bluefrost fox) – 475,000 pelts (according to the Oslo Fur Auctions).
- At the end of November 2015, Finland's Fur Traders offered, among other things, 80,000 frozen, untreated blue fox tails, each for 0.60 euros.

Global production
	Blue foxes	White foxes	Source
1864	6,500	85,000	Heinrich Lomer
1900	20,000	90,000	Paul Larisch / Joseph Schmidt
1910	11,000	83,000	Alexander Tuma
1923/24	38,000	160,000	Emil Brass
1930	23,000	170,000	IPA – Internationale Pelzfach-Ausstellung Leipzig
1950	94,000	140,000	Dr. Lübsdorf (in: Das Pelzgewerbe) (Plus 8000 arctic foxes)
1975/76	2,017.420		Arthur C. Prentice
