= Cross fox =

Color-variation of the common fox

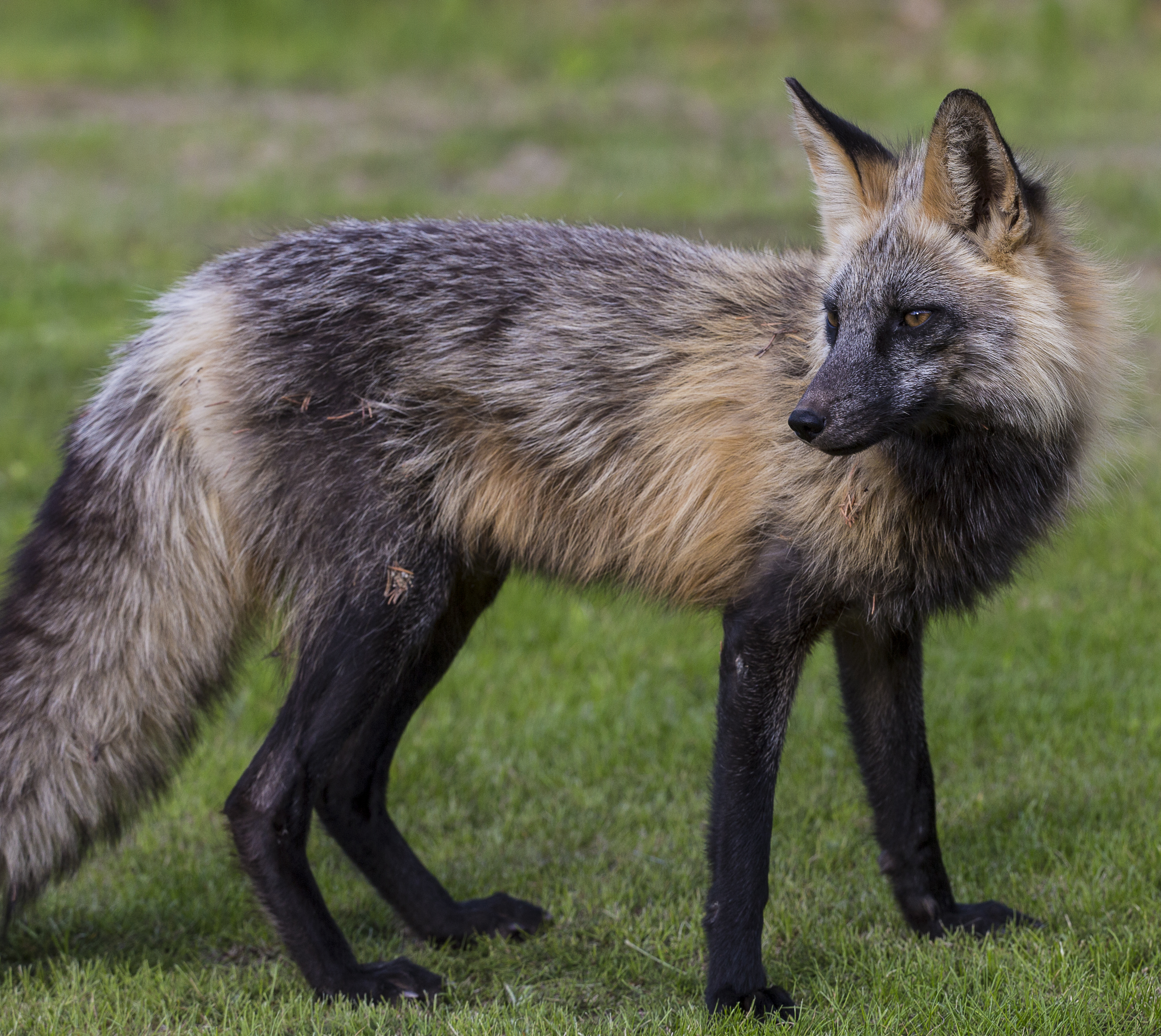
Cross fox

The cross fox is a partially melanistic colour variant of the red fox (Vulpes vulpes) which has a long dark stripe running down its back, intersecting another stripe to form a cross over the shoulders. It tends to be more abundant in northern regions of Canada, and is rarer than the common red form, but is more common than the even darker silver fox.

== Taxonomy ==
At one time the cross fox was considered to be a separate species from the red fox, and was given the binomial name Canis decassatus (the fox genus Vulpes was then commonly included in the dog genus Canis). Fur farmers and trappers continued to treat each red fox colour form as a distinct species until long after scientists concluded that they were variations of the same one.

== Distribution ==
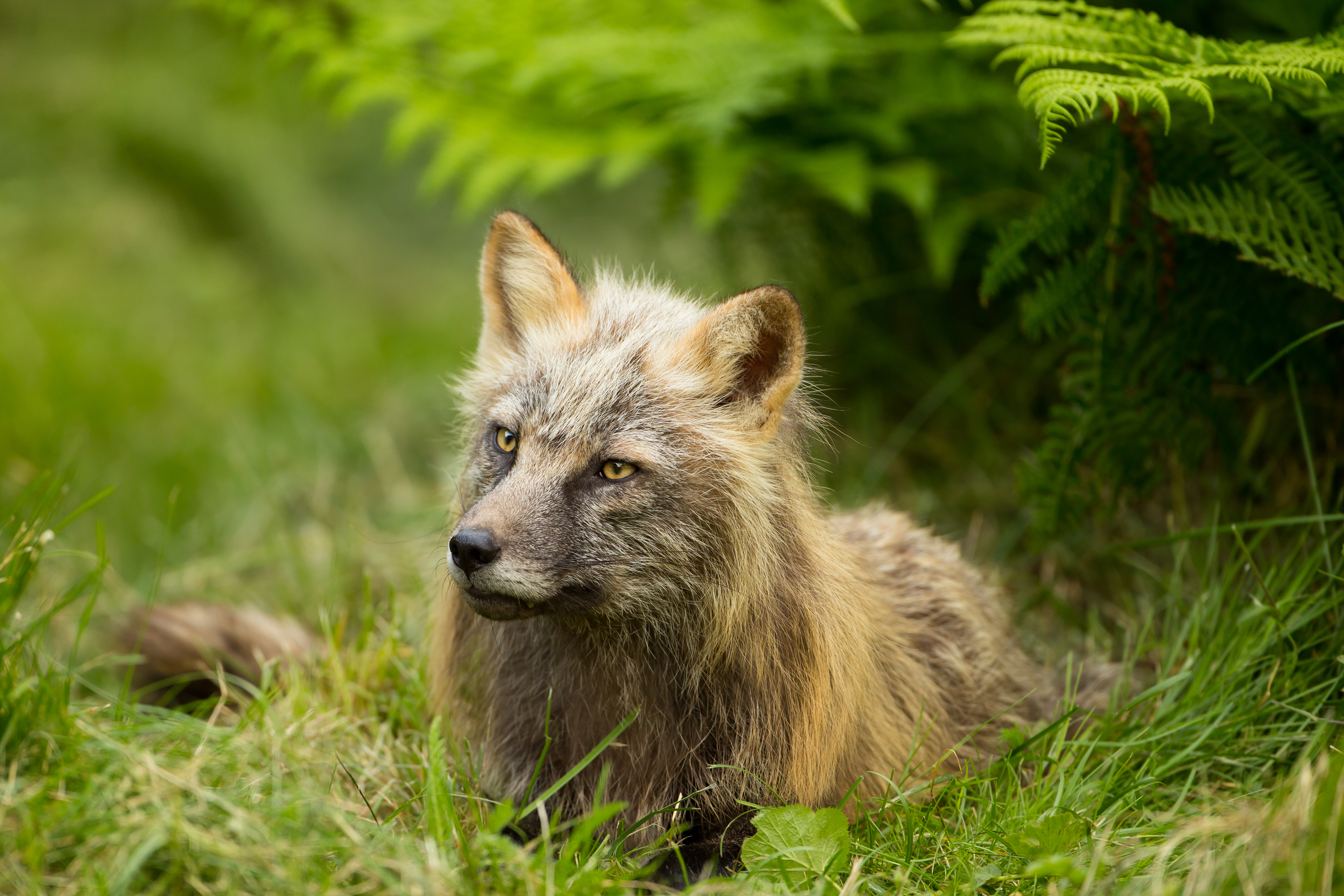
A cross Kodiak fox in Alaska.

Cross foxes are relatively common in the northern areas of North America, and comprise up to 30% of Canada's red fox population. Cross foxes were once abundant in Idaho and Utah before being largely killed off.

Cross foxes are occasionally reported in Scandinavia, having been described by Conrad Gessner and Olaus Magnus. A study based on nearly 3,000 skins of the red fox in Finland, revealed that 99% were of the reddish form, with cross foxes comprising only 0.3% out of the remaining 1%.

== Description ==
In physical conformation, melanistic fox are identical to red foxes, though according to Teancum's Mammals of Utah (1922), they may be slightly larger with a bushier tail and with more wool under the feet. The cross fox derives its name from the vertical dark band running down the back, which is intersected with another horizontal band across the shoulders. The back and sides are yellowish rufous, which is more vivid on the flanks and the sides of the neck. Excepting the muzzle, the upper part of the head, the hind quarters and the outsides of the shoulders and thighs have dusky brown underfur and black outer fur. The flanks and sides of the neck are reddish yellow, while the muzzle, ears and underparts of the leg are black. The long hairs of the tail are greyish or yellowish red with black tips, though the tip of the tail is sometimes white. They are distinguished from "bastard" foxes (which are usually the result of a red/silver fox mating) by the dorsal stripe which is black rather than dark red.

== Fur use ==
Although cross foxes were historically hunted and bred for their fur, they were not considered as valuable as silver foxes. They were however considered prestigious enough to be used to adorn the leaders of certain religious communities. In the late 19th century, 4,500 cross fox pelts were exported by the Hudson's Bay Company annually, while 3,500 cross fox skins were annually disposed of at auction by the London fur companies.

The value of a cross fox pelt depended largely on the darkness of the coat, with pale coats commanding cheaper prices than darker ones. Cross foxes were not considered as valuable as silver foxes, but were more expensive than red foxes, being worth 4–5 guineas per skin as opposed to the common red variety's 15 shillings.

== See also ==
- Silver fox (animal)
