= Domesticated silver fox =

Type of fox

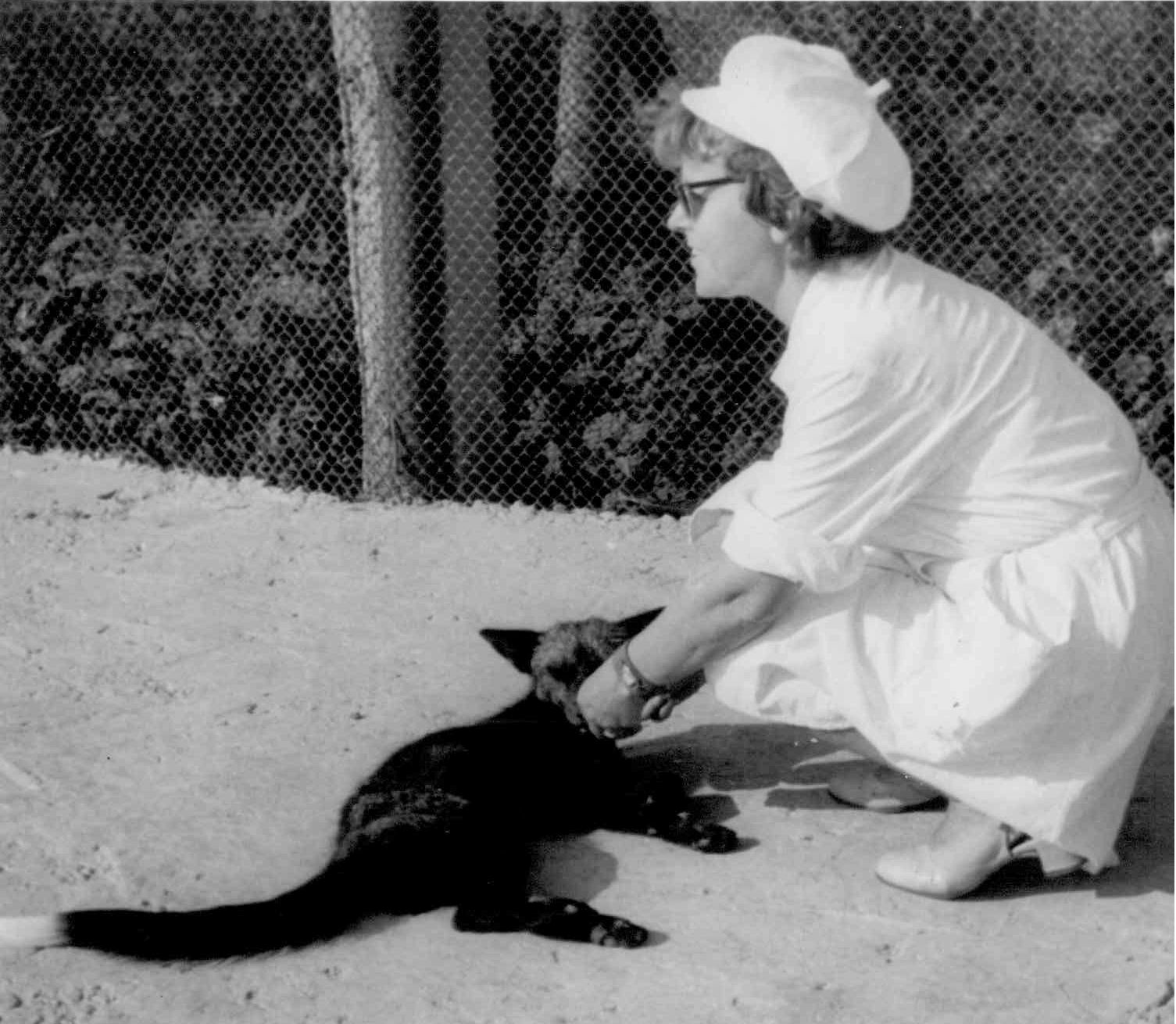
Lyudmila Trut with a domesticated silver fox, 1974

The domesticated silver fox (Vulpes vulpes forma amicus) is a form of the silver fox, a melanistic form of the wild red fox, that has been to some extent domesticated under laboratory conditions. Domesticated silver foxes are the result of an experiment designed to demonstrate the power of selective breeding to transform species, as described by Charles Darwin in On the Origin of Species. The experiment at the Institute of Cytology and Genetics in Novosibirsk, Russia, explored whether selection for behaviour rather than morphology may have been the process that had produced dogs from wolves, by recording the changes in foxes when in each generation only the most tame foxes were allowed to breed. Many of the descendant foxes became both tamer and more dog-like in morphology, including displaying mottled- or spotted-coloured fur.

In 2019, an international research team questioned the conclusion that this experiment had provided strong support for the validity of domestication syndrome. They did conclude that it remains "a resource for investigation of the genomics and biology of behavior".

== Initial beliefs and research ==
Dmitry Belyayev questioned how the diversity of canine breeds had arisen from the domestic dog's lupine ancestors. Like other scientists, he "could not figure out what mechanism could account for the differences in anatomy, physiology, and behavior" that were obvious in dogs, but he was confident that the answer lay "in the principles of Mendelian inheritance."

The available research concluded that domesticated animals differ in several ways from their wild counterparts. Belyayev believed that many domesticated animals had a number of phenotypic traits in common. This hypothesis is called the domestication syndrome; it was challenged in 2019.

Scientists did not know what principle of selection had guided the Neolithic farmers who had first domesticated these species thousands of years ago. Belyayev's hypothesis was that "all domesticated species had been selected for a single criterion: tameness." Belyayev further theorized that this attribute "had dragged along with it most of the other features that distinguish domestic animals from their wild forebears, like droopy ears, patches of white in the fur and changes in skull shape." Jason Goldman of Scientific American said, "Belyaev hypothesized that the anatomical and physiological changes seen in domesticated animals could have been the result of selection on the basis of behavioral traits. More specifically, he believed that tameness was the critical factor."

Academic Claudio J. Bidau wrote that Belyayev's suspicion was "that domestication was ruled by a process of 'destabilizing selection' affecting mechanisms of ontogenetic neuroendocrine control, either directly or indirectly in response to the appearance of a factor of stress", and that "the key factor of domestication producing striking similar results in many species is selection for tameness."

Goldman said Belyayev wondered if a breeding program that involved "selecting for tameness and against aggression would result in hormonal and neurochemical changes, since behavior ultimately emerged from biology. Those hormonal and chemical changes could then be implicated in anatomy and physiology. It could be that the anatomical differences in domesticated dogs were related to the genetic changes underlying the behavioral temperament for which they selected (tameness and low aggression). He believed that he could investigate these questions about domestication by attempting to domesticate wild foxes." He decided to study the silver fox and to observe how the fox responds to selective pressures for tame behaviour.

Belyayev chose the silver fox for his experiment, "because it is a social animal and is related to the dog." The silver fox had, however, never before been domesticated. Belyayev designed a selective-breeding program for the foxes that was intended to reproduce a single major factor, namely "a strong selection pressure for tamability". This breeding experiment would be the focus of the last 26 years of Belyayev's life.

== Domestication ==
The fox species had been hard to domesticate. It would not breed in cages. Belyayev himself failed to establish a captive breeding population of river otters unaccustomed to people. Few bred successfully in captivity and the attempt was discontinued.

Belyayev did not initiate the domestication process of the Arctic fox, but rather began the scientifically rigorous documentation of the existing process, which had then been ongoing for 66 years. The domestication was well documented, satisfying Belyayev's desire to understand the domestication process from its inception with a given species.

== Experiment ==
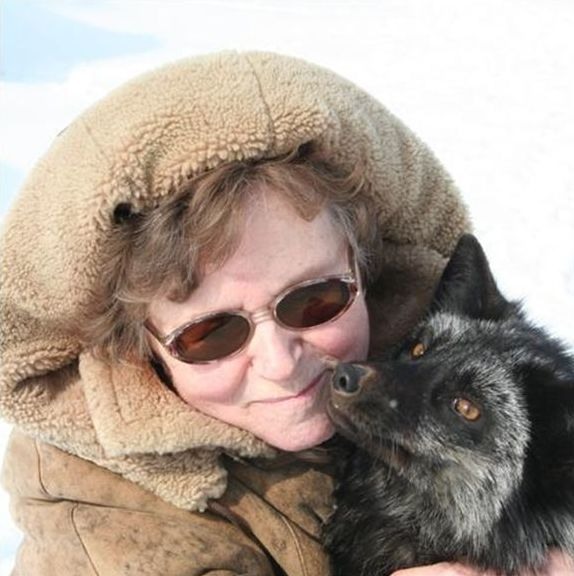
Lyudmila Trut with a domesticated silver fox

Lyudmila Trut was a graduate who was chosen as manager of the program. In 1952, she began to collect the tamest foxes from fur farms. They "began with 30 male foxes and 100 vixens, most of them from a commercial fur farm in Estonia." From the beginning, Belyayev chose foxes solely for tameness, allowing only a tiny percentage of male offspring, and a slightly larger percentage of females, to breed. The foxes were not trained, in order to ensure that their tameness was a result of genetic selection and not of environmental influences. For the same reason, they spent most of their lives in cages and were permitted only brief encounters with human beings.

Belyayev set down strict guidelines for the breeding program. Goldman said, "Starting at one month of age, and continuing every month throughout infancy, the foxes were tested for their reactions to an experimenter. The experimenter would attempt to pet and handle the fox while offering it food. In addition, the experimenters noted whether the foxes preferred to spend time with other foxes, or with humans." After the fox had reached sexual maturity at an age of seven to eight months, "they had their final test and were assigned an overall tameness score." Among the factors that went into this score were the tendency "to approach an experimenter standing at the front of its home pen" and "to bite the experimenters when they tried to touch it."

As reported on by Trut, the tests for tameness took the following form, which was still in use as of 2009: "When a cub is one month old, an experimenter offers it food from his hand while trying to stroke and handle the cub. The cubs are tested twice, once in a cage and once while moving freely with other cubs in an enclosure, where they can choose to make contact either with the human experimenter or with another cub. The test is repeated monthly until the cubs are six or seven months old." At the age of seven or eight months, the cubs are given a tameness score and placed in one of three groups. The least domesticated are in Class III; those that allow humans to pet and handle them, but that do not respond to contact with friendliness, are in Class II; the ones that are friendly with humans are in Class I. After only six generations, Belyayev and his team had to add a higher category, Class IE, the "domesticated elite", which "are eager to establish human contact, whimpering to attract attention and sniffing and licking experimenters like dogs. They start displaying this kind of behavior before they are one month old. By the 20th generation 35% were 'elite', and by the 30th generation 70% to 80% of the selected generation was 'elite'."

Once the foxes in each generation had been classified according to the latest research, only the least fearful and least aggressive foxes were selected for breeding. Goldman said, "In each successive generation, less than 20 percent of individuals were allowed to breed". The sole criterion for permitting them to breed was their tolerance of human contact.

== Results ==
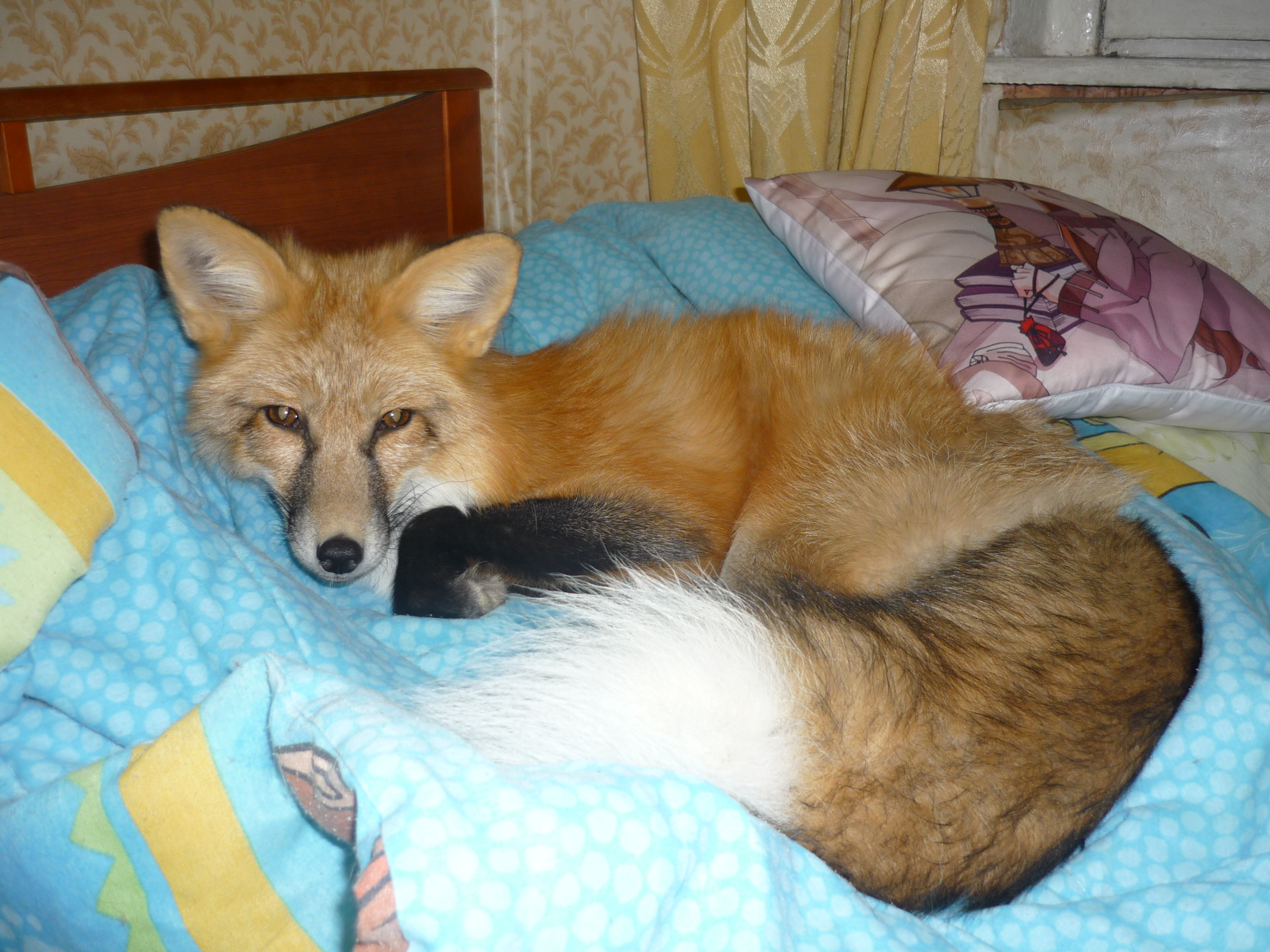
Domesticated male fox in a Russian household

In 1978, Belyayev reported at an Invitational Lecture at the 14th International Congress of Genetics in Moscow the types of changes that were observed by Belyayev and Trut in the tame-selected foxes. As early as the second generation, counting from 1959, the tameness score of the selected population continued to increase every generation. Tail wagging was observed in one male fox by the fourth generation (1963). As early as 1962 changes in the animals' reproductive behavior started taking place. They found that some of the tame foxes were showing signs of proestrus, as early as October–November, as opposed to the normal time of January–March.

By 1972, some of the females were coming into estrus in the October–November period. The males, by contrast, were not ready for mating. By 1976, the tamest females mated as early as 20 December; some of the females gave birth and then mated again in March–April. In the tenth generation (1969), floppy ears appeared in a female cub, as well as a piebald colouration on other tame cubs consisting of patches of white and brown on the belly, tail, and paws. A small white star patch appeared on the center of the forehead of one cub also in the tenth generation. Other correlated changes in the domesticated foxes reported by Belyaev included a shortened tail, a shortening and widening of the skull, and the tail rolled over the back.

The changes manifested by the tame foxes over the generations, moreover, were not only behavioral but also physiological, just as Belyayev had expected. The first physiological change detected in the tame foxes was a lower adrenaline level. Belyayev and his team "theorized that adrenaline might share a biochemical pathway with melanin, which controls pigment production in fur", a hypothesis that has since been confirmed by research. After eight to ten generations, the tame foxes began to develop multi-coloured coats, a trait found more in domesticated animals than in wild ones; this was followed by the development of "floppy ears and rolled tails similar to those in some breeds of dog". After 15 to 20 generations, a very small percentage of the tame foxes developed shorter tails and legs and underbites or overbites. The experimenters also discovered that the domesticated foxes show a fear response several weeks later than their wild counterparts, and that this delay is "linked to changes in plasma levels of corticosteroids, hormones concerned with an animal's adaptation to stress". After 12 generations of selective breeding, the corticosteroid level in the tame foxes' plasma was "slightly more than half the level in a control group". After 28 to 30 generations, "the level had halved again." At the same time, the tame foxes' brains contained higher levels of serotonin. Moreover, tame male foxes' skulls gradually became narrower, more like those of females, and litters became "on average, one cub larger".

After over 40 generations of breeding, in short, Belyayev produced "a group of friendly, domesticated foxes who 'displayed behavioral, physiological, and anatomical characteristics that were not found in the wild population, or were found in wild foxes but with much lower frequency…. Many of the domesticated foxes had floppy ears, short or curly tails, extended reproductive seasons, changes in fur coloration, and changes in the shape of their skulls, jaws, and teeth. They also lost their 'musky fox smell'." It was Belyayev's view that these new attributes, which were extremely similar to the attributes of other domesticated animals, "was the result of selection for amenability to domestication." His reasoning was that behavior is "regulated by a fine balance between neurotransmitters and hormones at the level of the whole organism ... . Because mammals from widely different taxonomic groups share similar regulatory mechanisms for hormones and neurochemistry, it is reasonable to believe that selecting them for similar behavior – tameness – should alter those mechanisms, and the developmental pathways they govern, in similar ways."

Trut wrote in 1999 "that after 40 years of the experiment, and the breeding of 45,000 foxes, a group of animals had emerged that were as tame and as eager to please as a dog." Fitch described the tame foxes as "incredibly endearing". The New York Times wrote that they: "were clean and quiet and made excellent house pets, though — being highly active — they preferred a house with a yard to an apartment. They did not like leashes, though they tolerated them." Ceiridwen Terrill of Concordia University, who described Belyayev's fox farm in 2012 as looking like a set of "dilapidated army barracks", with "rows and rows of sheds that house about a hundred foxes each", said that the foxes were so tame that when she reached into a cage to show one of them some affection, it plainly "loved having its belly scratched". Some of the foxes had even been trained to fetch and sit. So it was, in the words of Scientific American, that: "selecting for a single behavioral characteristic — allowing only the tamest, least fearful individuals to breed — resulted in changes not only in behavior, but also in anatomical and physiological changes that were not directly manipulated."

== Significance ==
Belyayev's experimental animals and their descendants have been said to "form an unparalleled resource for studying the process and genetics of domestication". Brian Hare, a biological anthropologist, wanted to study "the unusual ability of dogs to understand human gestures". Hare "wanted to know if dogs' powerful rapport with humans was a quality that the original domesticators of the dog had selected for, or whether it had just come along with the tameness, as implied by Belyaev's hypothesis". He discovered "that the fox kits from Belyaev's domesticated stock did just as well as puppies in picking up cues from people about hidden food, even though they had almost no previous experience with humans."

Hare suggested that selection for tameness "may have been sufficient to produce the unusual ability of dogs to use human communicative gestures" and that the inability of wild wolves to pick up human cues is caused by their fear of humans. While Belyayev and his team "didn't select for a smarter fox but for a nice fox", Hare said, "they ended up getting a smart fox."

Belyayev's research, Hare further argues, has implications for the origins of human social behavior: "Are we domesticated in the sense of dogs? No. But I am comfortable saying that the first thing that has to happen to get a human from an apelike ancestor is a substantial increase in tolerance toward one another. There had to be a change in our social system."

Understanding the genetic reasons for wildness compared to tameness may provide more insight into human behaviour and how humans domesticated animals. National Geographic's Evan Ratliff asked: "Out of 148 large mammal species on Earth, why have no more than 15 ever been domesticated? Why have we been able to tame and breed horses for thousands of years, but never their close relative the zebra, despite numerous attempts?"

== After Belyayev's death ==
Belyayev died of cancer in 1985. After his death, his experiment was continued by Trut, who brought international attention to it with a 1999 article in American Scientist. By that year, after 40 years and 45,000 foxes, the experimenters had a population of 100 foxes, the product of 30 to 35 generations of selection. Trut expressed the belief in that year that "Belyayev would be pleased" with the posthumous results of his experiment, which has "compressed into a few decades an ancient process that originally unfolded over thousands of years", causing "the aggressive behavior of our herd's wild progenitors" to "entirely disappear". The experimenters, she wrote, "have watched new morphological traits emerge, a process previously known only from archaeological evidence." Trut suggested that the most important remaining question is "just how much further our selective-breeding experiment can go".

The collapse of the Soviet Union resulted in declining funds for scientific research, complicating Belyayev's and Trut's research continuation. They had difficulties even keeping the foxes alive. Belyayev died in 1985 before he could salvage the institute, so Trut fought to maintain the fox research. The experiment was under the supervision of Lyudmila Trut, till her death on 9 October 2024. When Anna Kukekova, a Russian-born postdoctoral researcher in molecular genetics at Cornell University, read about the project's financial difficulties, she secured funding from the National Institutes of Health and joined in Trut's effort to complete Belyayev's work, making it a joint Russian-American initiative.

== Further research ==
The results from the experiments led the scientists at the institute to research domestication of other animals, such as rats in 1972, mink, and river otters. Similar research was carried out in Denmark with American minks, producing the domestic mink. The project also bred the least-tameable foxes to study social behavior in canids. These foxes avoided human contact, as do their wild behavioral phenotypes.

Detailed genetic and physiological studies on the foxes have been done by Trut and colleagues. For example, the star-shaped pattern was found to be controlled by one dominant gene that was incompletely penetrant, "but its penetrance is significantly higher in offspring from tame mothers than from aggressive ones". Trut reported that female foxes heterozygous for the gene controlling the star pattern also influenced the number of male cubs, increasing the number of males over the expected 50%. As the fox experiment has progressed over time, it was found that in general the number of male cubs increased over the expected 50% to approximately 54%.

Early in the experiment, Trut and Belyaev started comparing the hormonal responses of the tame and control foxes. They showed that selection for tame behavior caused the levels of 11-oxycorticosteroids in the blood to be reduced; selection had also caused the morphology of adrenal glands to change. Levels of the sex hormones estradiol and progesterone differed. Belyaev stated: "Perhaps the most important observation emerging from this series of experiments is the fact that tame females exhibit statistically significant changes in certain neurochemical characteristics in such regions of the brain as the hypothalamus, midbrain, and hippocampus. The level of serotonin and its metabolite 5-hydroxyindoleacetic acid turned out to be higher in tame than in unselected females. This fact fits the type of behavior, since serotonin is known to inhibit some kinds of aggression. Serotonin plays a role in the central regulation of the hypothalmic-hypophyseal-adrenal-sexual system. Thus, selection for tame behavior is associated with changes in both the central and peripheral mechanisms of the neuro-endocrine control of ontogeny."

Trut and her colleagues have applied modern molecular techniques to the fox populations with the aim of not only identifying which genes are involved in domestication, but also in determining how changes in the fox genome compare to those of the domesticated dog. 400 canine microsatellites that are evenly distributed across the canine genome were analyzed in the fox genome. Based on amounts of homozygosity in both tame and aggressive foxes, it was found that there was no evidence of inbreeding between the two groups of foxes. In order to help understand the neurobiology of behavior, fox and dog orthologs of serotonin receptor genes were cloned. Using 320 microsatellites Trut and co-workers showed that all 16 fox autosomes and one X chromosome were covered, and that there was a high conservation of marker order between homologous regions of foxes and dogs, even though the fox genome has 16 pairs of metacentric autosomes and the dog has 37 pairs of acrocentric autosomes. Additional studies by these workers have shown that tameness and aggressiveness are associated with at least two loci.

In 2005, DNA microarrays were utilized to find the differences in genetic expression between domesticated, non-domesticated (farm-raised), and wild foxes. It was found that there was a difference of 40 gene expressions between the domesticated and non-domesticated foxes. Although there was a difference in the genes of the three groups, the experimenters did not look into the behavioural and functional consequences of these differences. In 2007, a system of measuring fox behavior was described that is expected to be useful in QTL mapping to explore the genetic basis of tame and aggressive behavior in foxes.

=== Breeding for aggression ===
After initiating his selective breeding program for tameness, Belyayev also began breeding a line of fearful, aggressive foxes. In addition, he started domesticating other animals. He and his team started working with rats in 1972, and later with minks and, briefly, with river otters, although this last experiment was abandoned because the species "proved difficult to breed". The experiments with rats and minks, however, proved successful, with the subjects becoming tame alongside the foxes. After Belyayev's death, his rat experiment was carried on by Irina Plyusnina. "Siberian gray rats caught in the wild, bred separately for tameness and for ferocity", reported The New York Times, "have developed ... entirely different behaviors in only 60 or so generations". When geneticist Svante Pääbo was in Novosibirsk in 2003, he visited the institute, and "was stunned" by the two groups of rats. "After just 30 years of selection", Pääbo said, "the IC&G researchers had fashioned two populations that could hardly be more different."

In 2006, Frank Albert, a graduate student at the Max Planck Institute for Evolutionary Anthropology in Leipzig, Germany, was helping to continue Belyayev's work by studying the genetic roots of the differences between the tame and hyper-aggressive rats. In 2009, Albert and several colleagues published a paper in Genetics about the results of their cross-breeding of tame and hyper-aggressive rats, a stock of which they had established in Leipzig. In 2011, it was reported that Albert's team had "found several key regions of the genome that have a strong effect on tameness" and that they suspected the involvement of "at least half a dozen genes". The next step was "to locate individual genes that influence tameness and aggression".

Elaine Ostrander of the National Human Genome Research Institute at the National Institutes of Health told National Geographic in 2011, "Understanding what has changed in these animals is going to be incredibly informative. Everyone is waiting with great excitement for what they come out with."

== Status ==
In 2014, officials stated that the number of foxes was never reduced and is still stable at about 2,000 foxes. As of August 2016, there are 270 tame vixens and 70 tame dogs on the farm.

The suggestion has been made "that the foxes be made available as pets, partly to ensure their survival should the Novosibirsk colony be wiped out by disease". Raymond Coppinger, a dog biologist at Hampshire College in Massachusetts, US noted that at one time "Soviet science was in a desperate state and Belyayev's foxes were endangered", but his own efforts "to obtain some of the foxes to help preserve them" had been unsuccessful, with the animals apparently having "left Russia only once, for Finland, in a colony that no longer survives". The author of the National Geographic article about the experiments, however, said that his translator, Luda Mekertycheva, had adopted two foxes from Novosibirsk and that they had proven to be wonderful companions who "jump on my back when I kneel to give them food, sit when I pet them, and take vitamins from my hand".

Between 2010 and 2012, a firm called "SibFox" was advertising foxes from the Novosibirsk lab for about $6,000 each, although, according to Popular Science, "it's not clear that anyone ever actually received one of these foxes." Reportedly, "two foxes that actually shipped to the States ended up confiscated at the U.S. border and shipped to the Austin Zoo and Animal Sanctuary."

The sculpture "Dmitriy Belyaev and Domesticated Fox" was built near the Institute of Cytology and Genetics (Novosibirsk) in honor of the 100th anniversary of Belyaev's birth. The tamed fox gives the scientist a paw and wags its tail. Konstantin Zinich, sculptor (Krasnoyarsk):

The philosophy of touching a fox and a man is rapprochement, kindness, there is no aggression from the fox – it was wild, and he made it genetically domesticated.

Its opening was held as part of the Belyaev Conference 2017.

As of 2023, 12 sterilized foxes have been exported from the Institute of Cytology and Genetics to the Judith A. Bassett Canid Education and Conservation Center in Santa Ysabel, California, US.

== Criticisms ==
Elinor Karlsson, a biologist at the University of Massachusetts Medical School, and colleagues published a paper on December 3, 2019, in Trends in Ecology and Evolution arguing domestication syndrome may not actually exist, that the foxes were not totally wild to begin with, and that some of the traits attributed to domestication existed long before the experiment began. Karlsson does not question the value of the experiment, instead calling for a focus on other issues and downplaying or rejecting the domestication syndrome hypothesis. Conversely, Adam Wilkins of Humboldt University of Berlin, challenges Karlsson's criticisms, analyzing how subtle developmental causes can produce an array of diverse and non-uniform domestication syndrome effects in different species. Lee Alan Dugatkin further notes that the evidence that the foxes were already part-domesticated is slim and equivocal, and that the foxes did in fact gain new traits only after the experiment began: "It's extraordinarily unlikely that there was kind of hidden genetic variation for these traits."

== See also ==
- De novo domestication
- Experimental evolution
- Fuegian dog, an extinct domesticated South American fox
- Genomics of domestication
- Neoteny
- List of domesticated animals
