= De novo domestication =

Domestication of new species

De novo domestication is a process where new species are genetically altered to meet human needs, such as agriculture or companionship. It is performed both by farmers and scientists, and can be done through traditional selective breeding or modern biotechnological methods. Targets for de novo domestication are often species that have never been under cultivation, but may also include wild relatives of already domesticated species.

== Definition ==
De novo domestication refers to the process by which wild species are intentionally transformed into domesticated varieties. The majority of domesticated species has been under domestication for millennia, with the first animal, the dog, having been under domestication for between 40,000-30,000 years, and the first plants since the start of the Neolithic Revolution, approximately 12,000 years ago. This initial process of domestication is hypothesized to have been a passive process, resulting from the subconscious selection of individuals performing better in agricultural contexts. The scientific field of de novo domestication seeks to domesticate new species in an accelerated manner as opposed to over the course of thousands of years, as more domesticated species may provide an advantage to humanity, especially in agriculture. Newly domesticated crop species may allow for alternatives to agricultural extensification in regions where yields are plateauing, make agricultural systems more resilient to climate change, and increase the sustainability of agriculture.

De novo domestication does not only happen in a scientific context, but that the active domestication of new species is also performed by farmers, especially in the Global South. The collection and subsequent agricultural integration of traditionally wild-gathered food plants still happens to this day, and also constitutes de novo domestication.

The terminology in the scientific field of domestication is seen as inconsistent and non-standardized, with the same term meaning different things to different scientists. This means that in some cases, de novo domestication is solely used for species that have no history of domestication, while in other cases, it can be used to describe further studies into semi-domesticated crops, which already have gone through (early) stages of domestication.

== In plants ==
The study of de novo domestication is most prevalent in plants, due to the implications new crops may bring to agriculture. There are two potential applications to the study of de novo domestication in plant sciences: the introduction of novel crops into agricultural systems and the redomestication of wild relatives of conventionally domesticated crops.

=== Novel species ===
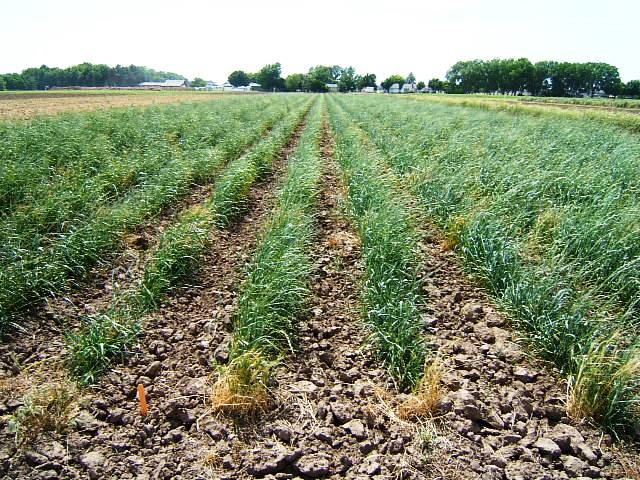
A nursery in a project aiming at the de novo domestication of Thinopyrum intermedium (intermediate wheatgrass), a perennial grain.

The introduction of novel species into agricultural systems has the potential to radically alter their workings. One set of candidates for de novo domestication are perennial grains, cereal crops that can be harvested for multiple seasons after planting, as opposed to the annual grains that dominate agriculture. The successful de novo domestication of a perennial grain would drastically reduce the need for yearly plowing, seedling protection and energy spent on reaching maturity, thus decreasing environmental impact and labour use. The de novo domestication of tropical fruit trees is suggested to be able to help address 14 out of 17 of the Sustainable Development Goals set by the United Nations, either directly or indirectly.

=== Redomestication ===
Another use for de novo domestication is the redomestication of wild relatives of domesticated crops. Through millennia under selection, most domesticated crops have undergone many genetic bottlenecks, drastically reducing their genetic diversity, and thus the ability to breed in new traits. Meanwhile, these bottlenecked crops have been spread over the entire world, and are often grown in areas with climates that differ significantly from their genetic center of origin. Redomestication of crop wild relatives may offer a solution to long-term, repetitive plant breeding projects seeking to integrate wild relative DNA from the center of origin into established hybrid cultivars. This is especially relevant for crops that are reproductively incompatible with their wild relatives through processes such as polyploidization, such as hexaploid wheat, where integration of wild relative DNA through traditional breeding projects is difficult.

== In animals ==
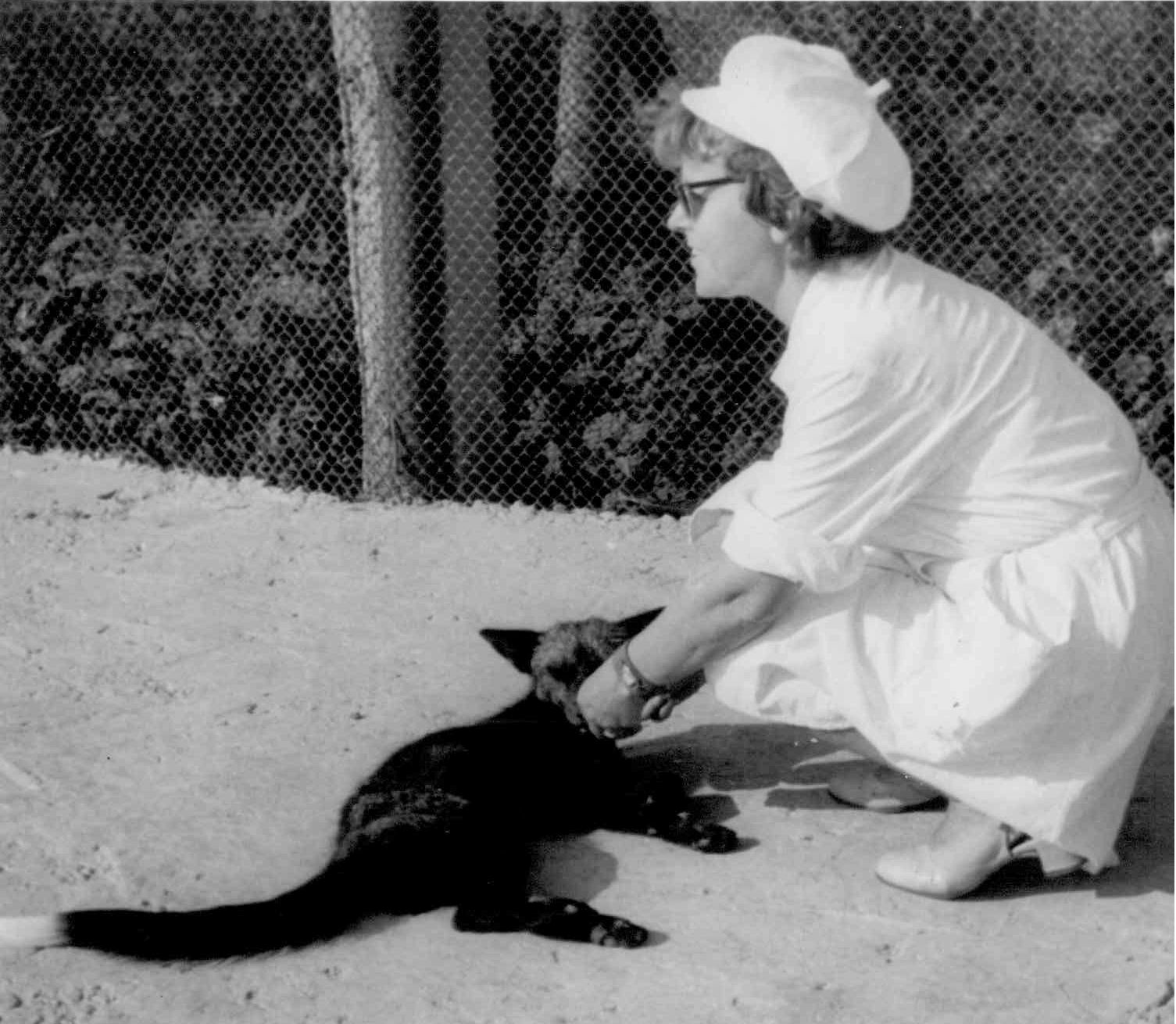
Lyudmila Trut with a domesticated silver fox, 1974

The de novo domestication of animals has less scientific traction than that of plants, but one notable project is that undertaken by the Russian Institute of Cytology and Genetics to domesticate the fox. This project aimed to study the theory of evolution and domestication syndrome by attempting the domestication of foxes, but was not primarily aimed at providing a new domesticated animal. De novo domestication of fish, either in the ornamental aquarium trade or for the purposes of pisciculture is also ongoing.

== In fungi ==
Fungiculture, the cultivation of fungi such as mushrooms, has historically been less important than horticulture or animal husbandry in providing food for humans. Mushrooms were often gathered from the wild, but the knowledge to do so has largely disappeared in the Global North due to lifestyle changes and urbanization, prompting an increased need for mushroom cultivation. As a result, many fungi were de novo domesticated, such as snow fungus (1866), oyster mushroom (1917), and milky white mushroom (1974). A fungus that has been notoriously difficult to bring under cultivation is white truffle, and projects to de novo domesticate it are running.

== See also ==
- Genetic manipulation
