= Lee Dugatkin =

American evolutionary biologist (born 1962)

- Born: Lee Alan Dugatkin; July 8, 1962; New York City
- Scientific career
- Institutions: University of Louisville
- Thesis: Game theory and the evolution of cooperation: models and tests (1991)
- Doctoral advisor: David Sloan Wilson

Lee Alan Dugatkin is an evolutionary biologist, animal behaviorist and historian of science at the University of Louisville. His research includes work on the evolution of cooperation, the evolution of altruism, the evolution of aggression, the evolution of culture, the process of domestication, the evolution of antibiotic resistance, the evolution of monozygotic twinning, social networks in nonhumans, and the role of natural history in 18th and 19th century America and Europe. Dugatkin's work has been cited in the literature more than 16,000 times.

== Education ==
Dugatkin graduated from Stuyvesant High School in 1980: his classmates that year included physicists Brian Greene and Lisa Randall and cultural historian M.G. Sheftall. He earned his B.A. from Binghamton University in 1984, his M.S. from SUNY Albany, working with Jerram Brown in 1987, and his Ph.D. at Binghamton University under the supervision of David Sloan Wilson in 1991.

== Books ==
Dugatkin is the author of Principles of Animal Behavior, currently in its fifth edition. Together with Carl Bergstrom he is author of Evolution (WW Norton, 2023), a textbook now in its third edition.

Dugatkin co-authored How to Tame a Fox and Build a Dog (University of Chicago Press, 2017) with Russian geneticist Lyudmila Trut. How to Tame a Fox and Build a Dog discusses Dmitry Belyayev and Lyudmila Trut's work on domesticating the silver fox. The New York Times Book Review called it "part science, part Russian fairy tale, and part spy thriller". Forbes Magazine told readers "If you read only two biology books this year, [How to Tame a Fox] is one of those two that you simply must read."

== Online lectures, talks and presentations ==
- Dugatkin, Lee (November 2, 2019). "How to Tame a Fox and Build a Dog" (video). youtube.com. Marine Biological Laboratory.
- Dugatkin, Lee (May 6, 2014). "The Evolution of Goodness" (video). youtube.com. Allan Wilson Center, Presented at Auckland Museum, Auckland, New Zealand.
- Dugatkin, Lee (September 23, 2019). "Mr. Jefferson and the Giant Moose: When Natural History and History Collide" (video). youtube.com. University of Wisconsin–Stevens Point.
- Dugatkin, Lee (September 28, 2016). "The Deep Roots of Power" (video). youtube.com. KET.
- Dugatkin, Lee (April 22, 2022). "Power in the Wild with Lee Alan Dugatkin" (video). youtube.com. Cooperation Science Network.
- Dugatkin, Lee (October 13, 2024). "The Well Connected Animal" (video). youtube.com. The Capital District Humanist Society.
- Dugatkin, Lee (September 6, 2022). "Vavilov's Dream" (video). youtube.com. Orkney International Science Festival.
- Dugatkin, Lee (February 21, 2021). ""The Rise and Fall of Peale's Museum"" (video). youtube.com. Locust Grove.
- Dugatkin, Lee (September 5, 2021). ""The Prince of Evolution"" (video). youtube.com. Orkney International Science Festival.
- Dugatkin, Lee (November 13, 2013). ""Smashing Wallace's White Picket Fence"" (video). youtube.com. AMNH.

== Collaborations ==
Since the late 1980s, Dugatkin has collaborated on journal articles and books with: David Sloan Wilson, Carl Bergstrom, Lyudmila Trut, Marc Bekoff, Alasdair Houston, Andrew Sih, Rufus Johnstone, Jacob Hoglund, Anne Barrett Clark, Phil Crowley, Kern Reeve, Ivan Chase, Sheng-Feng Shen, Scott Gleeson, Ryan Earley, Ronald Atlas, Mike Perlin, Michael Mesterton-Gibbons, Matthew Hasenjager, Jean-Guy Godin and Michael Alfieri.

== Selected publications ==
- Dugatkin, L.A. (1992). Sexual selection and imitation: females copy the mate choice of others". The American Naturalist 139: 1384-1389.
- Dugatkin, L. A. (1997). Cooperation Among Animals: an Evolutionary Perspective. Oxford University Press.
- Dugatkin, L.A. (2006). The Altruism Equation: Seven Scientists Search for the Origins of Goodness. Princeton University Press
- Dugatkin, LA. (2009). Mr. Jefferson and the Giant Moose: Natural History in Early America. University of Chicago Press.
- Dugatkin, L. A., & Trut, L. (2017). How to Tame a Fox (and Build a Dog): Visionary Scientists and a Siberian Tale of Jump-started Evolution. University of Chicago Press.
- Dugatkin, L.A. (2020). Behind the Crimson Curtain: The Rise and Fall of Peale's Museum. Butler Books.
- Dugatkin, L.A. (2021). The Enlightenment of Gotham: How Four Men Transformed New York City at the Start of the 19th Century. Butler Books.
- Dugatkin, L.A. (2022). Power in the Wild: The Subtle and Not-So-Subtle Ways Animals Strive for Control over Others. University of Chicago Press.
- Bergstrom, C. T., & Dugatkin, L. A. (2023). Evolution. WW Norton & Company. 3rd edition.
- Dugatkin, L.A. (2024). Dr. Calhoun's Mousery: The Strange Tale of a Celebrated Scientist, a Rodent Dystopia, and the Future of Humanity. University of Chicago Press.
- Dugatkin, L.A. (2024).The Well-Connected Animal Social Networks and the Wondrous Complexity of Animal Societies. University of Chicago Press.
- Dugatkin, L.A. (2025). The Botanist and Citizen Genet: André Michaux's 1793 Expedition to the Pacific and America's First Diplomatic Crisis. Butler Books.
