= Dmitry Belyayev (zoologist) =

Russian geneticist and academic

Academician Dmitry Konstantinovich Belyaev
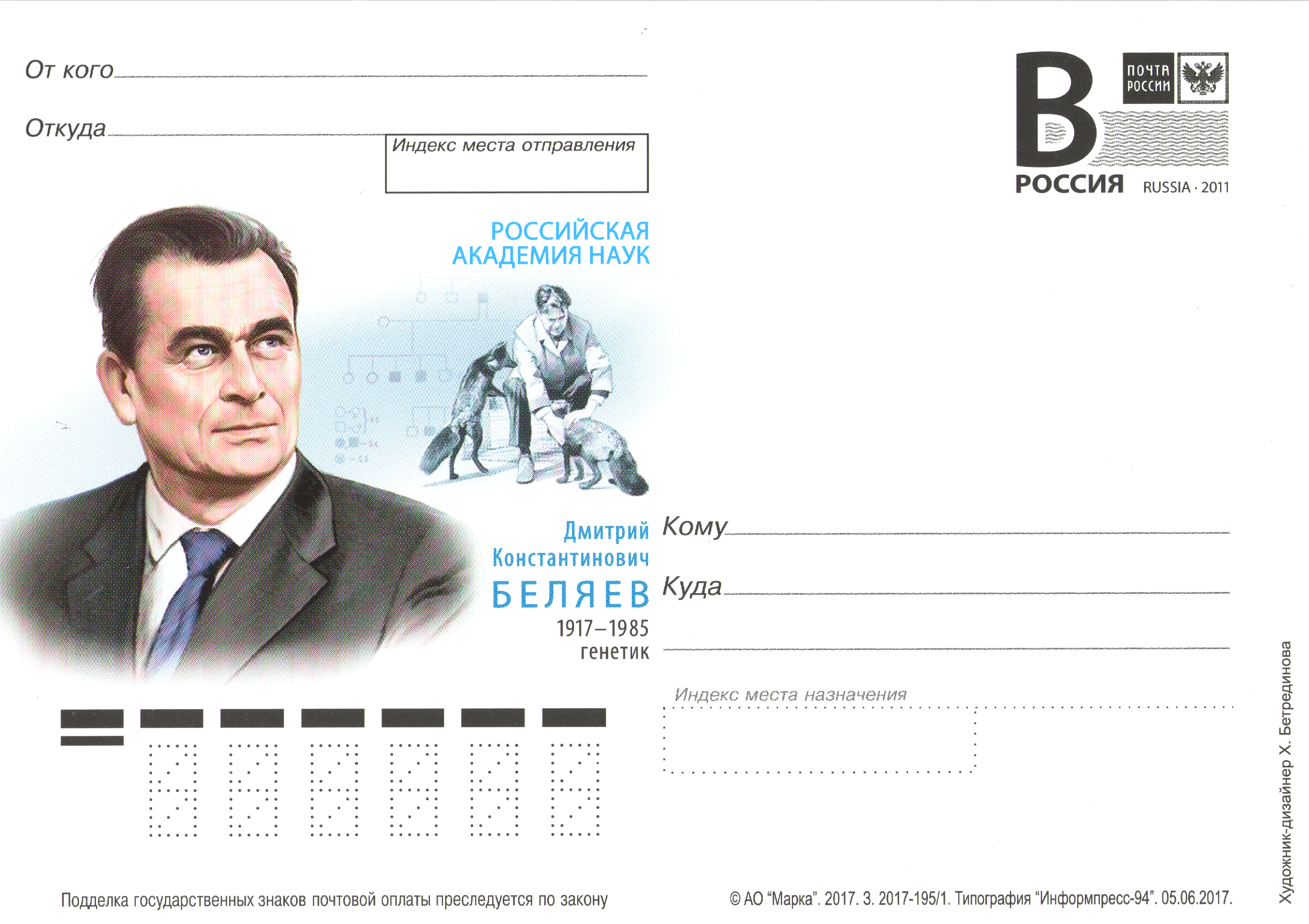
- Dmitry Belyaev and Domesticated Fox
- Born: 17 July 1917; Protasovo, Kostroma Governorate, Russian Empire
- Died: 14 November 1985 (aged 68); Novosibirsk, Soviet Union
- Citizenship: Soviet Union
- Education: Ivanovo Agricultural Institute
- Known for: Domestication of fox
- Scientific career
- Fields: Genetics, Theory of selection and evolution
- Workplaces: Institute of Cytology and Genetics, AN SSSR, Novosibirsk

Dmitry Konstantinovich Belyayev (Russian: Дми́трий Константи́нович Беля́ев, IPA: [ˈdmʲitrʲɪj kənstɐnʲˈtʲinəvʲɪd͡ʑ bʲɪˈlʲæ(j)ɪf]; 17 July 1917 – 14 November 1985) was a Soviet geneticist and academician who served as director of the Institute of Cytology and Genetics (IC&G) of the USSR Academy of Sciences, Novosibirsk, from 1959 to 1985. His decades-long effort to breed domesticated silver foxes was described by The New York Times as “arguably the most extraordinary breeding experiment ever conducted.” A 2010 article in Scientific American stated that Belyayev “may be the man most responsible for our understanding of the process by which wolves were domesticated into our canine companions.”

Beginning in the 1950s, in order to uncover the genetic basis of the distinctive behavioral and physiological attributes of domesticated animals, Belyayev and his team spent decades breeding the silver fox (Vulpes vulpes) and selecting for reproduction only those individuals in each generation that showed the least fear of humans. After several generations of controlled breeding, a majority of the silver foxes no longer showed any fear of humans and often wagged their tails and licked their human caretakers to show affection. They also began to display spotted coats, floppy ears, curled tails, as well as other physical attributes often found in domesticated animals, thus confirming Belyayev’s hypothesis that both the behavioral and physical traits of domesticated animals could be traced to "a collection of genes that conferred a propensity to tameness—a genotype that the foxes perhaps shared with any species that could be domesticated".

Belyayev’s experiments were his response to a politically motivated demotion, defying the now discredited non-Mendellian theories of Lysenkoism, which were politically accepted in the Soviet Union at the time. Belyayev has since been vindicated in recent years by major scientific journals, and by the Soviet establishment as a pioneering figure in modern genetics.

== Early life and education ==
Belyayev was born on 17 July 1917, in Protasovo, a town in the Russian province of Kostroma. He was his family's fourth and youngest son. His father, Konstantin Pavlovich, was a priest. His brother Nikolai, who was 18 years his senior, was a prominent geneticist who worked with Sergei Chetverikov (1880–1959), a pioneer of population genetics.

"It was his brother's influence that caused him to have this special interest in genetics," Belyayev's protégé Lyudmila Trut later said. Both Belyayev brothers were Darwinists and believers in Mendelian genetics. At the time Belyayev came of age, however, life was dangerous in the Soviet Union for geneticists with such views, because the Stalinist regime supported the scientific theories of agronomist Trofim Lysenko and outlawed research inspired by the findings of Gregor Mendel. As Trut recalled, "genetics was considered fake science." Indeed, under the rule of Stalin, leading geneticists who believed in Darwinian evolution and Mendelian genetics were considered enemies of the state. Several of them were sent to prison, and at least one, Nikolai Vavilov, was sentenced to death, and died of starvation in prison in 1943.

== Early career ==
The next year, Belyayev graduated from the Ivanov Biological Institute and began working in the Department of Fur Animal Breeding at the Central Research Laboratory in Moscow, which was affiliated with the Ministry of Foreign Trade. In 1941, he was conscripted into the military, and was wounded and received several military decorations. He then resumed work at the laboratory.

Despite the persecution of adherents of Darwinism and Mendelian genetics, Belyayev wrote a dissertation on "the variation and inheritance of silver-colored fur in silver-black foxes" and continued to hold fast to his belief in evolution and Mendelian genetics. Still, to be safe, he disguised his genetics research as studies in animal physiology. Nonetheless, his known interest in genetics led to his dismissal from his position as head of the Department of Fur Animal Breeding in 1948.

After the death of Stalin in 1953, the Soviet persecution of geneticists began to ease. From 1958 to the end of his life, Belyayev worked for the Siberian Division of the USSR Academy of Sciences, which he helped found. In 1963, he became Director of the Institute of Cytology and Genetics (IC&G) in Novosibirsk, and held that position until his death. Under his leadership, according to one source, "the institute became a center of basic and applied research in both classical genetics and modern molecular genetics." He was appointed an academician in 1973.

== Fox experiment ==
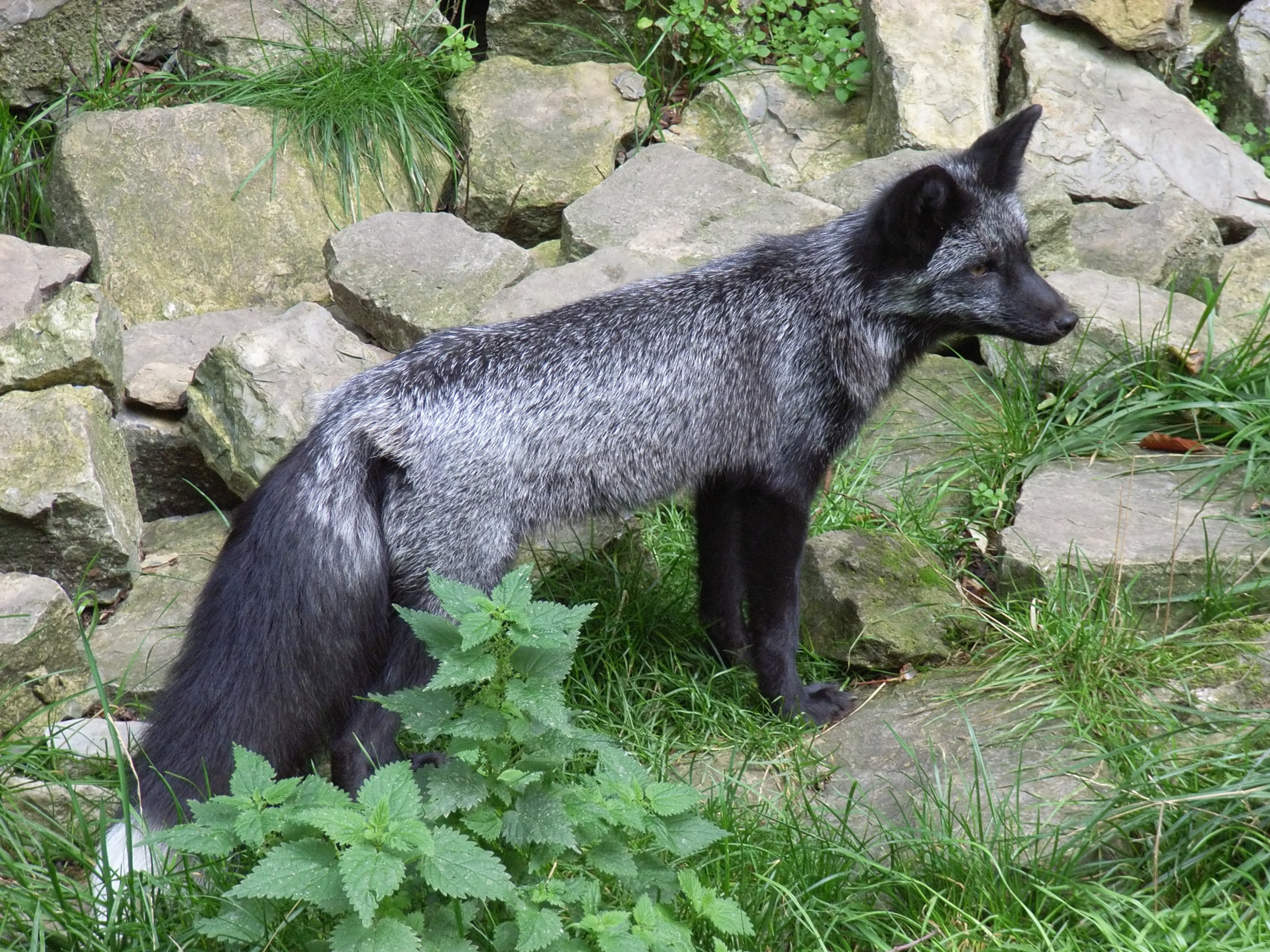
Domesticated silver fox

The domesticated silver fox is a form of the silver fox which has been domesticated - to some extent - under laboratory conditions. The silver fox is a melanistic form of the wild red fox. Domesticated silver foxes are the result of an experiment which was designed to demonstrate the power of selective breeding to transform species, as described by Charles Darwin in On the Origin of Species. The experiment explored whether selection for behaviour rather than morphology may have been the process that had produced dogs from wolves, by recording the changes in foxes when in each generation only the most tame foxes were allowed to breed. Many of the descendant foxes became both tamer and more dog-like in morphology, including displaying mottled or spotted coloured fur.

In 2019, an international research team questioned some of the conclusions that they suggested had been abusively drawn from this famous experiment (sometimes by the popular culture rather than the Russian scientists themselves), especially regarding the domestication syndrome while it remains "a resource for investigation of the genomics and biology of behavior", given the origin of the fox population used in a Canadian fur farm where some traits might have been pre-selected.

== Awards ==
- Order of the Red Star (1944)
- Order of the Patriotic War II degree (1944)
- Medal "For Victory over Germany in the Great Patriotic War of 1941-1945" (1945)

== Death ==
Belyayev died of cancer in 1985. After his death, his experiment was continued by his assistant Lyudmila Trut, who brought international attention to it with a 1999 journal article.

In 2017, the sculpture "Dmitry Belyaev and Domesticated Fox" was built near Institute of Cytology and Genetics (Novosibirsk) in the honor of the 100th anniversary of his birth. The tamed fox gives the scientist a paw and wags its tail. Konstantin Zinich, sculptor (Krasnoyarsk): "The philosophy of touching a fox and a man is rapprochement, kindness, there is no aggression from the fox - it was wild, and he made it genetically domesticated." Its opening was held as part of the Belyaev Conference 2017.

== Selected writings ==
- Belyayev, D. K. & L. N. Trut (1964). Behaviour and reproductive function of animals. I. Correlation of behaviour type with the time of reproduction and fertility. Bulletin of the Moscow Society of Naturalists Biological Series (in Russian) 69(3):5-19.
- Belyayev, D. K. & L. N. Trut (1964). Behaviour and reproductive function of animals. II. Correlated changes under breeding for tameness. Bulletin of the Moscow Society of Naturalists Biological Series (in Russian) 69(5): 5-14.
- Belyayev, D. K. (1969). Science (USSR), 5 (1), 47-52. Belyayev, D. K. (1974). "Some questions of stabilizing and destabilizing selection". In: History and theory of the evolutionary doctrine (in Russian). Leningrad, pp. 76–84.
- Belyaev, D. K. (September 1979). "Destabilizing selection as a factor in domestication". Journal of Heredity. 70 (5): 301–308. doi:10.1093/oxfordjournals.jhered.a109263. PMID 528781.
- Belyaev, D. K.; Ruvinsky, A. O.; Trut, L. N. (July 1981). "Inherited activation-inactivation of the star gene in foxes". Journal of Heredity. 72 (4): 267–274. doi:10.1093/oxfordjournals.jhered.a109494. PMID 7288139.
- Eriskovskaya, N. K.; Leont'eva, T. A.; Tsellarius, Yu. G.; Trut, L. N.; Belyaev, D. K. (July 1985). "Relative hypertrophy of the right ventricle in silver foxes selected for domestication". Bulletin of Experimental Biology and Medicine. 100 (1): 984–988. doi:10.1007/BF00839336. S2CID 22917636.
- Ruvinsky, A. O.; Lobkov, Yu. I.; Belyaev, D. K. (September 1986). "Spontaneous and induced activation of genes affecting the phenotypic expression of glucose 6-phosphate dehydrogenase in Daphnia pulex: 3. Occurrence frequencies of the alternative electrophoretic variants of G6PD in a natural population". Theoretical and Applied Genetics. 72 (6): 811–815. doi:10.1007/BF00266550. PMID 24248205. S2CID 32401800.
