= Monument to the laboratory mouse =

Monument in Novosibirsk, Russia

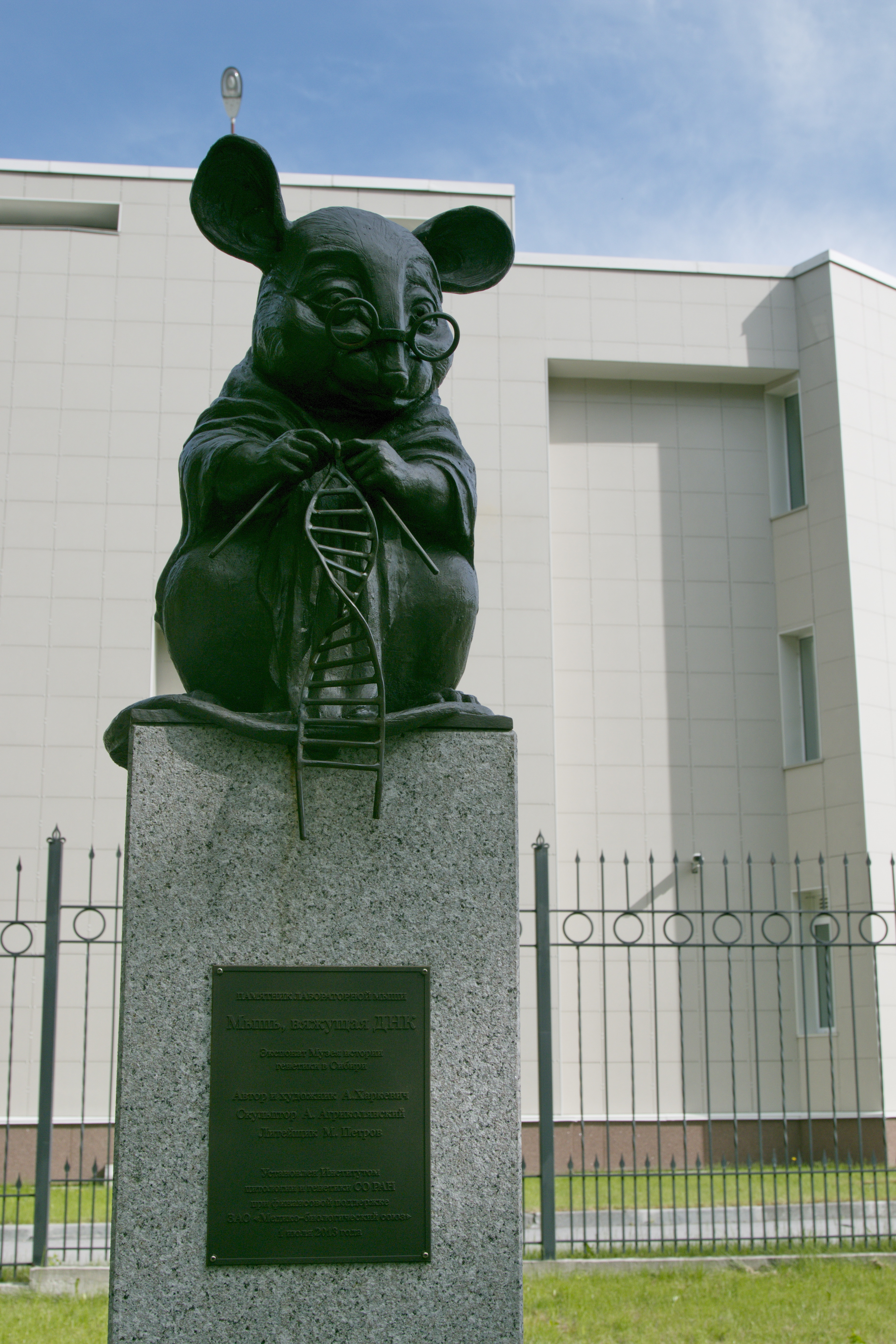
- Interactive map of Monument to the laboratory mouse
- Location: Akademgorodok, Novosibirsk, Russia
- Coordinates: 54.848675°N 83.10655°E
- Designer: Andrey Kharkevich

The Monument to the laboratory mouse is a sculpture in Novosibirsk' Akademgorodok, Siberia, Russia. It is located in a park in front of the Institute of Cytology and Genetics of the Russian Academy of Sciences, and was completed on July 1, 2013, coinciding with the 120th anniversary of the founding of the city.

The monument commemorates the sacrifice of the mice in genetic research used to understand biological and physiological mechanisms for developing new drugs and curing of diseases.

== Description ==
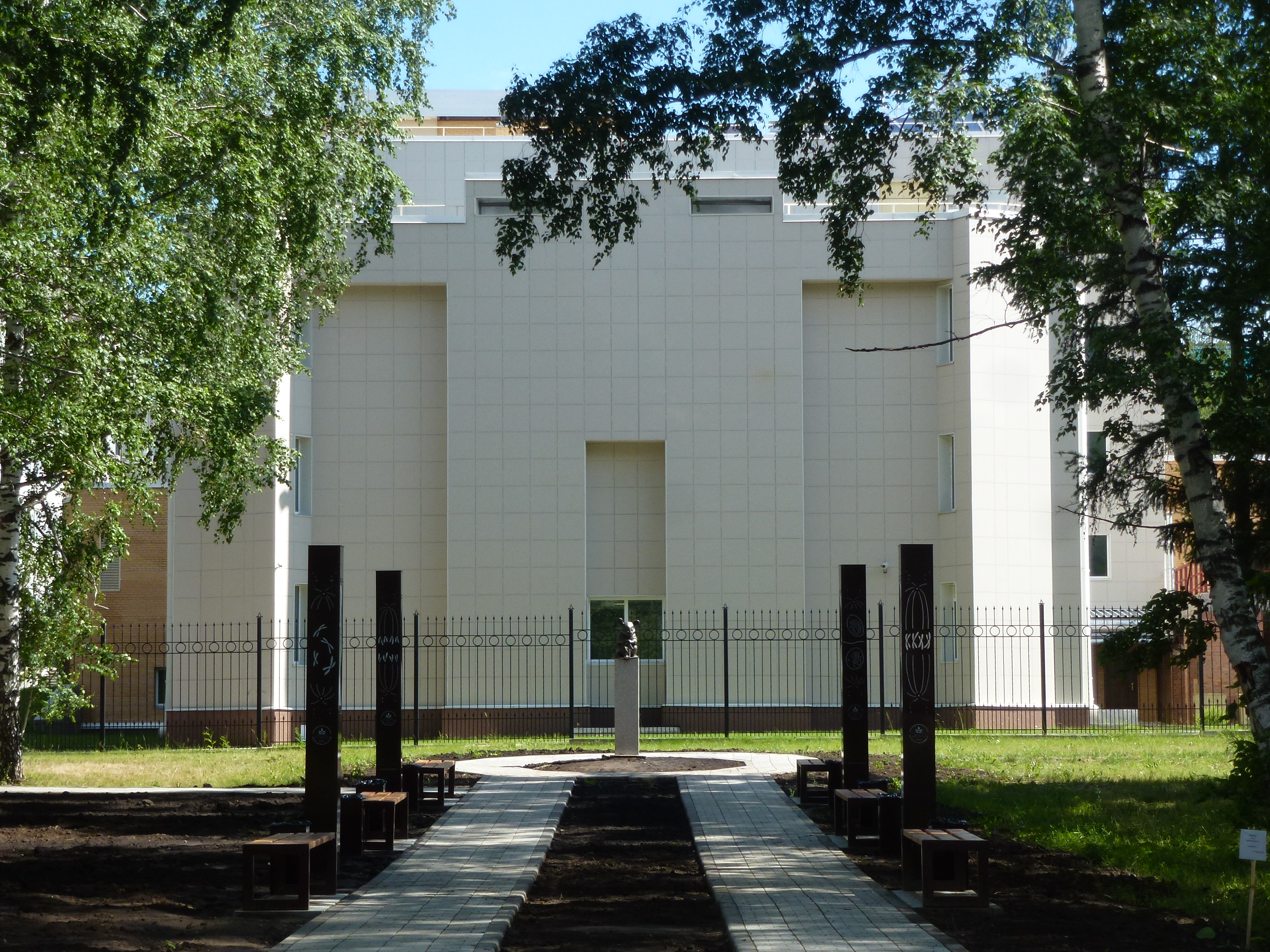
Institute of Cytology and Genetics

The monument, which sits on a granite pedestal, is of a laboratory mouse wearing pince-nez on the tip of its nose. The mouse holds knitting needles in its paws and is shown knitting a double helix of DNA. The bronze figure is itself only 70 cm (27 1/2 in) high, but the total height of the monument including the pedestal is 2.5 meters (98 in). The DNA spiral emerging from the knitting needles winds to the left, thus showing that it is the still poorly understood Z-DNA - this symbolic of scientific research that is still to be done. In contrast, the more common B-DNA (depicted in school lessons) winds to the right.

=== Inscription ===
Translated from Russian:

Monument of a laboratory mouse, wearing glasses perched on the end of its nose, sitting atop a granite pedestal

The mouse holds needles in its hands, knitting the twin spiral of DNA

Exhibit of the Museum of the History of Genetics in Siberia

Author and artist A. Kharkevich

Sculptor A. Agrikolyansky

Foundryman M. Petrov

Installed by the Institute of Cytology and Genetics, Siberian Branch of the Russian Academy of Sciences

With the financial support of CJSC "Medico-Biological Union"

July 4, 2013.

== Background ==
The foundation stone of the monument was laid on June 1, 2012, in honor of the 55th anniversary of the founding of the Institute of Cytology and Genetics. The design for the mouse was the creation of the Novosibirsk artist Andrey Kharkevich, who made more than ten sketches before settling on a final design. It was from among the different versions of the classic and stylized image animals that a mouse knitting the DNA helix was selected.

Andrei Kharkevich described his design, stating, "It combines both the image of a laboratory mouse and a scientist, because they are interconnected and serve the same cause. The mouse is captured at the moment of scientific discovery. If you look closely at her eyes, you can see that this mouse has already come up with something. But the whole symphony of scientific discovery, joy, "eureka!" have not sounded yet."

Sculptor Alexei Agrikolyansky, who made the statue, confessed that it had not been easy to capture that moment as the mouse was obviously not human and yet he had to produce a character and emotions for the mouse that were believable and, while maintaining the anatomical proportions, create something that neither looked like a cartoon character nor a real mouse.

The sculpture was cast from bronze in Tomsk by Maxim Petrov.
