= Carl Bergstrom =

American theoretical and evolutionary biologist

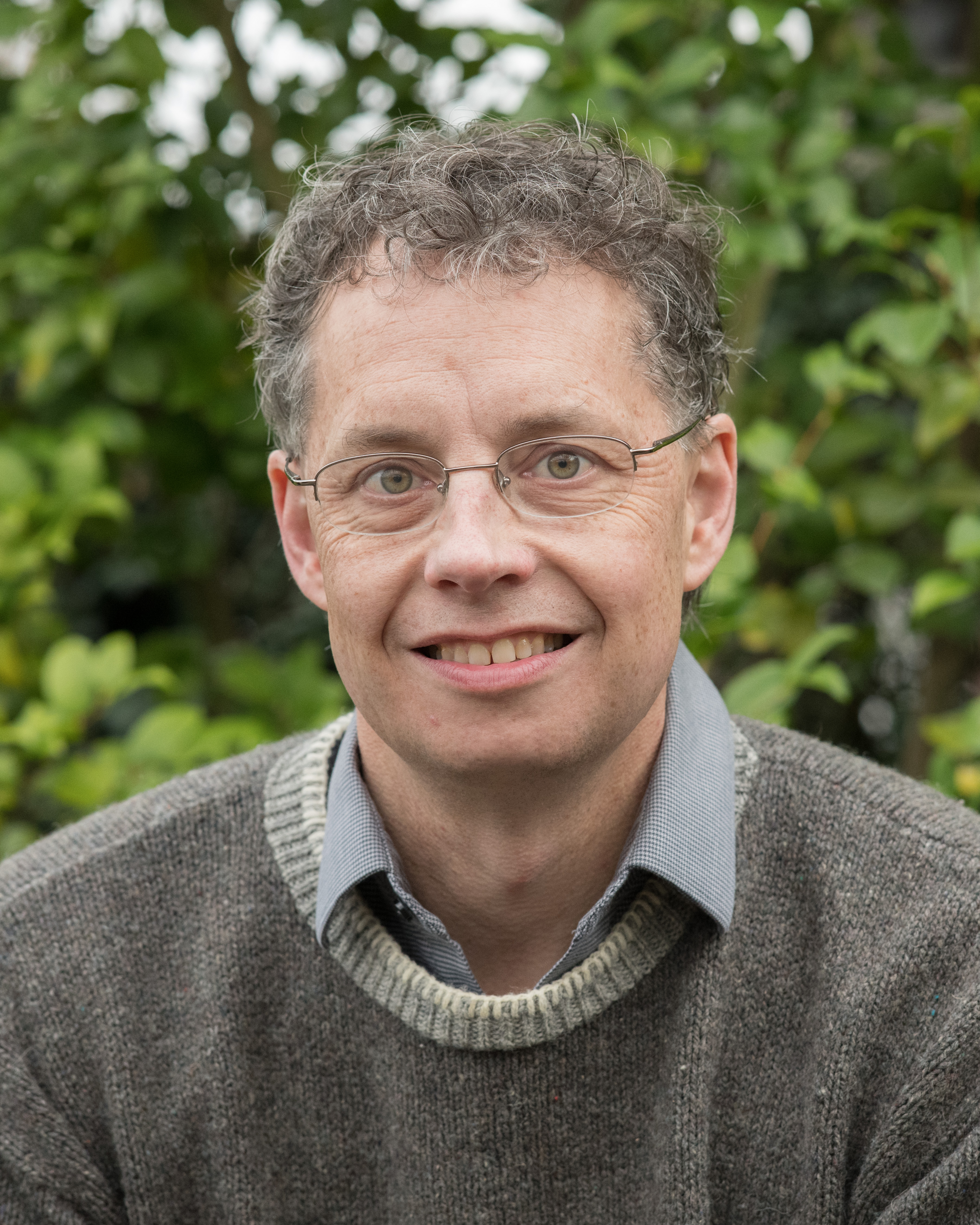
- Born: Carl Theodore Bergstrom
- Education: Harvard University (BA); Stanford University (PhD)
- Known for: Eigenfactor; Disinformation dynamics
- Scientific career
- Workplaces: University of Washington
- Thesis: Game-theoretic models of signalling among relatives (1998)
- Doctoral advisor: Marcus Feldman
- Website: ctbergstrom.com

Carl Theodore Bergstrom is a theoretical and evolutionary biologist and a professor at the University of Washington in Seattle, Washington, United States. Bergstrom is a critic of low-quality or misleading scientific research. He is the co-author of a book on misinformation called Calling Bullshit: The Art of Skepticism in a Data-Driven World and teaches a class by the same name at University of Washington.

== Education ==
Bergstrom earned his B.A. from Harvard University in 1993, then completed his Ph.D. at Stanford University under the supervision of Marcus Feldman in 1998.

== Research ==
Bergstrom's work concerns the flow of information through biological and social networks, as well as the ecology and evolution of pathogenic organisms, including the development of resistance.

He is the coauthor (with Lee Dugatkin) of a college textbook, Evolution. With Jevin D. West, a computer science professor at the University of Washington, he developed the popular course and website "Calling Bullshit". His work has led to the identification of him as a resource to explain the dynamics of disinformation and misinformation, in general. In 2025, together with Jevin West, he designed and published a free, short, online course titled “Modern-Day Oracles or Bullshit Machines?” to help understand the risk and reward of large language models, and identify misinformation generated using AI technology.

In addition to evolutionary biology, Bergstrom's interests include the ranking of scientific journals. In 2007, he introduced the Eigenfactor, metrics for journal ranking. This and related work on open access earned him and his father, Ted Bergstrom, the SPARC Innovator Award in June 2007.

== See also ==
- Brandolini's law
- On Bullshit
