= Lyudmila Trut =

Russian geneticist, ethologist and evolutionist (1933–2024)

- Людмила Трут
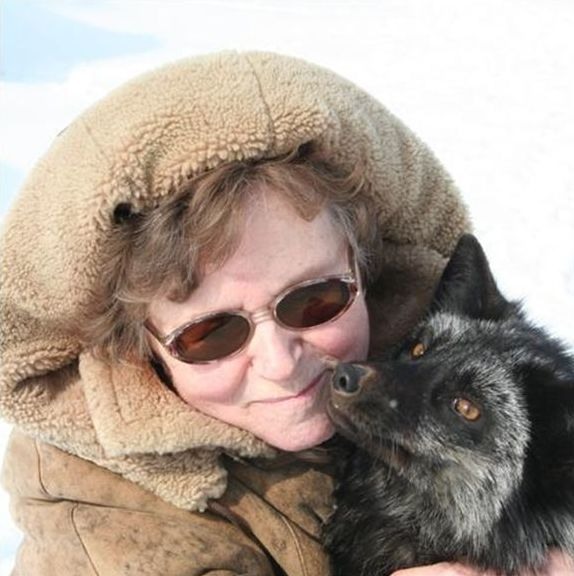
- Trut in 2012
- Born: Lyudmila Nikolayevna Trut; 6 November 1933; Yuriev-Polskiy, Ivanovo Oblast, Russian SFSR, USSR
- Died: 9 October 2024 (aged 90); Novosibirsk, Russia
- Awards: Gold and Silver medals of the Exhibition of Economic Achievements of the USSR (Domesticated foxes); Prize of the Presidium of the Academy of Sciences of the USSR named acad. N.I. Vavilov (1985); The Order of the Badge of Honor (21 August 1986); Winner of 2018 The American Association for the Advancement of Science (AAAS)/Subaru Science Books & Film Prizes for Excellence in Science Books

Lyudmila Nikolayevna Trut (Russian: Людми́ла Никола́евна Трут, IPA: [lʲʊdˈmʲiɫə nʲɪkɐˈɫa(j)ɪvnə trut]; 6 November 1933 – 9 October 2024) was a Russian geneticist, ethologist, and evolutionist. She is known for developing domesticated silver foxes from wild foxes with Dmitry Belyayev at the Institute of Cytology and Genetics in Novosibirsk, Russia. The experiment, started in 1952, continues to this day covering nearly 60 generations of silver foxes selected for "tameness." She held the positions of Senior researcher for Evolutionary genetics, Institute of Cytology and Genetics SB AS USSR, from 1969 to 1985; Head of Laboratory for Evolutionary Genetics, Institute of Cytology and Genetics, USSR, 1985 to 1990; Main Scientific Employee in the Laboratory for Evolutionary Genetics, Institute of Cytology and Genetics SB AS USSR, from 1990; and Professor in Genetics, from 2003 at the Institute of Cytology and Genetics. She coordinated educational activities at the experimental fox farm at the Institute of Cytology and Genetics of the Russian Academy of Sciences in Novosibirsk, Russia. Trut was elected to the American Academy of Arts and Sciences in 2020. She died in Novosibirsk on 9 October 2024, at the age of 90.

== Early life and education ==
Trut grew up in the town of Kirzhach in the Soviet Union, now Russia. She graduated with Honors at Moscow State University in 1958, majoring in biology. In 1966, she earned a Candidate of Sciences degree from the Institute of Cytology and Genetics in Novosibirsk. Her thesis was titled: "On correlation of behavior characteristics with reproductive function in fur bearing animals of the Canidae family." In 1981, she was awarded a Doctor of Sciences degree from the same institution, writing her thesis on the behavior of domesticated silver foxes.

== Research ==
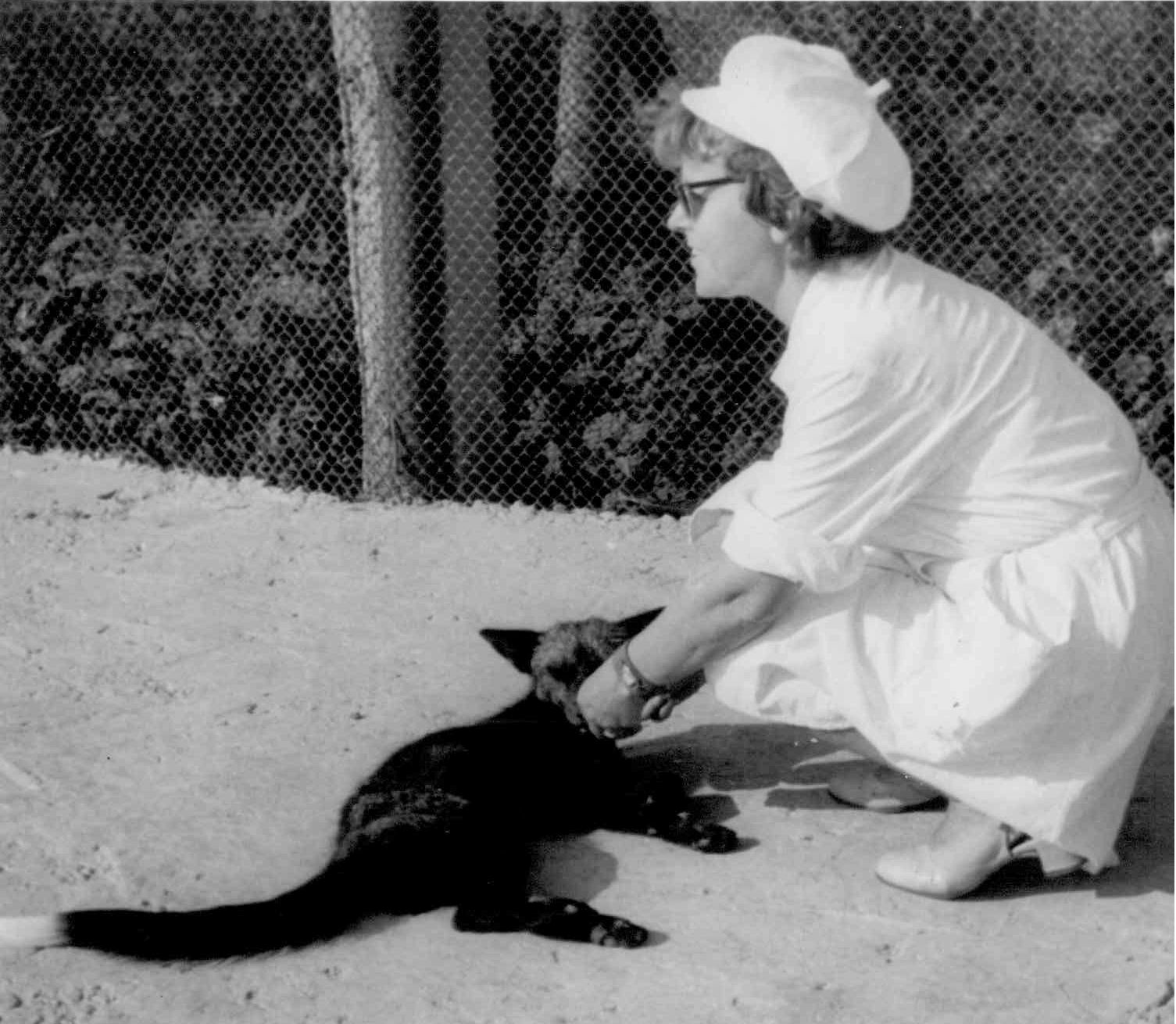
L. Trut and domestic fox (1974)

The silver fox is a melanistic form of the red fox. Domesticated silver foxes are the result of an experiment which was designed to demonstrate the power of selective breeding to transform species, as described by Charles Darwin in On the Origin of Species. The experiment explored whether selection for tame behavior produced dogs from wolves. Only the tamest members of each generation were allowed to breed, and the changes in the population were recorded. Many of the descendant foxes became both tamer and more dog-like in morphology, including displaying mottled or spotted fur.

The experiment was under the supervision of Trut.
