= M. G. Sheftall =

American historian

Mordecai George Sheftall is an American author and scholar living in Japan since 1987. His major publications to date are Nagasaki: The Last Witnesses (2025), Hiroshima: The Last Witnesses (2024) and Blossoms in the Wind: Human Legacies of the Kamikaze (2005).

He is a professor of modern Japanese cultural history and communication in the Faculty of Informatics at Shizuoka University, a branch campus of the Japanese national university system. Sheftall's writing and research activities focus on the modern evolution of Japanese national identity, with particular emphasis on the Japanese experience in World War II and the lingering effects of that conflict on both collective and individual Japanese consciousness.

Fluent and literate in Japanese, he is a frequent commentator on modern Japanese history, culture and identity issues in public symposia and Japanese broadcast and print news media. He has also been a featured commentator and technical advisor on the History Channel series "Dogfights." He has contributed chapters to scholarly volumes on the legacy of the Second World War in modern Japanese society and on the historical, cultural and sociological analysis of the effect of military defeat on modern societies. His books explore the legacy of Japan's wartime activities.

Sheftall graduated from Stuyvesant High School in New York City, attended the United States Military Academy at West Point for two years as a member of the Class of 1984, and received a B.A. in Political Science/International Relations from Fordham University in 1985. He holds master's degrees from California State University and the University of Birmingham, and received his Ph.D. in International Relations Studies from Waseda University in Tokyo. Sheftall's Waseda dissertation employs a methodological framework based on Terror Management Theory to analyze the evolution of kamikaze ideology during Japan's Imperial Era (1895–1945) and the interpretive discourse of this historical legacy in postwar Japan.

From 2012 to 2013, he was a visiting research fellow at the International Research Center for Japanese Studies in Kyoto, researching discourses of war memory in postwar Japan and the effect of same on modern Japanese culture.

== Bibliography ==
- Nagasaki: The Last Witnesses (2025)
- Hiroshima: The Last Witnesses (2024)
- Blossoms in the Wind: Human Legacies of the Kamikaze (2005)

== References/Links ==
- Penguin Random House, author page.
- Sheftall, M.G. (2007) "Tattoi gisei: the aesthetics of "noble sacrifice" as discourse of re-masculinized national identity in postwar Japan." *Keio University, Global Security Research Institute Working Paper No.14.
- Sheftall, M.G. (2005) Blossoms In The Wind: Human Legacies Of The Kamikaze (New York: NAL Caliber)
- "In The Face Of Samurai Spirit", Japan Times, August 15, 2005.
