= Austin Zoo =

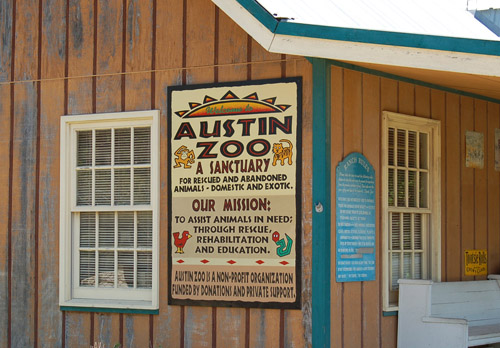
- Zoo entrance
- Interactive map of Austin Zoo
- 30.256876°N 97.935761°W
- Date opened: 1990 (as Good Day Ranch)
- Location: 10808 Rawhide Trail; Austin, Texas, U.S.
- Land area: 16 acres (6.5 ha)
- No. of animals: 300
- No. of species: 100
- Annual visitors: 232,000
- Memberships: ZAA
- Website: www.austinzoo.org

Austin Zoo is a non-profit rescue zoo and located in southwestern unincorporated Travis County, Texas, United States, west of Austin. The zoo is accredited by the Zoological Association of America.

The mission of Austin Zoo is to assist animals in need through rescue, conservation, and education. Austin Zoo currently has over 300 animals from over 100 different species, including African lions, Bengal tigers, cougars, three species of monkeys, black bears, ring-tailed lemurs, and porcupines.

== History ==
Austin Zoo started out as a goat ranch. In 1990, it became the Good Day Ranch, housing animals in need. At that time, the animals were mostly domesticated and local animals including goats, pigs, fallow deer, donkeys, and ponies, with just a few exotic animals. Gradually, the number of exotic animals increased, and in 1994, the name was changed to Austin Zoo. In 2000, the zoo became a 501(c)3 nonprofit organization. Today, the rescue zoo is a permanent home to mostly exotic animals that were rescued from or unwanted by their owners, animals from other zoos and sanctuaries, and animals who were awarded protection through the judicial system.

In 2009, the zoo became home to four wolf hybrids which had been abandoned during Hurricane Ike in 2008.

In 2017, the zoo was home to over 300 animals from over 100 different species and received 232,000 visitors.

== Exhibits ==
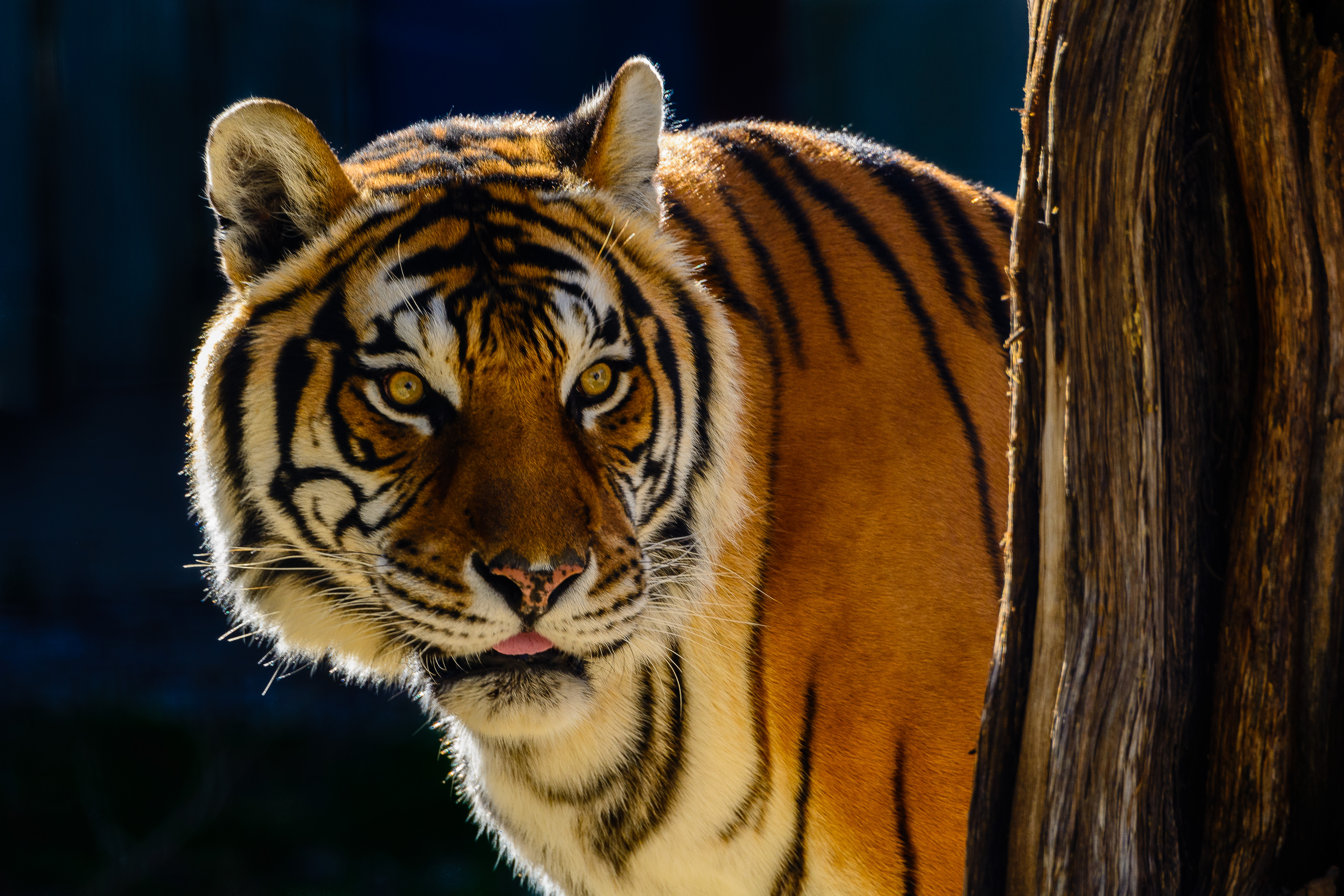
Bengal tiger

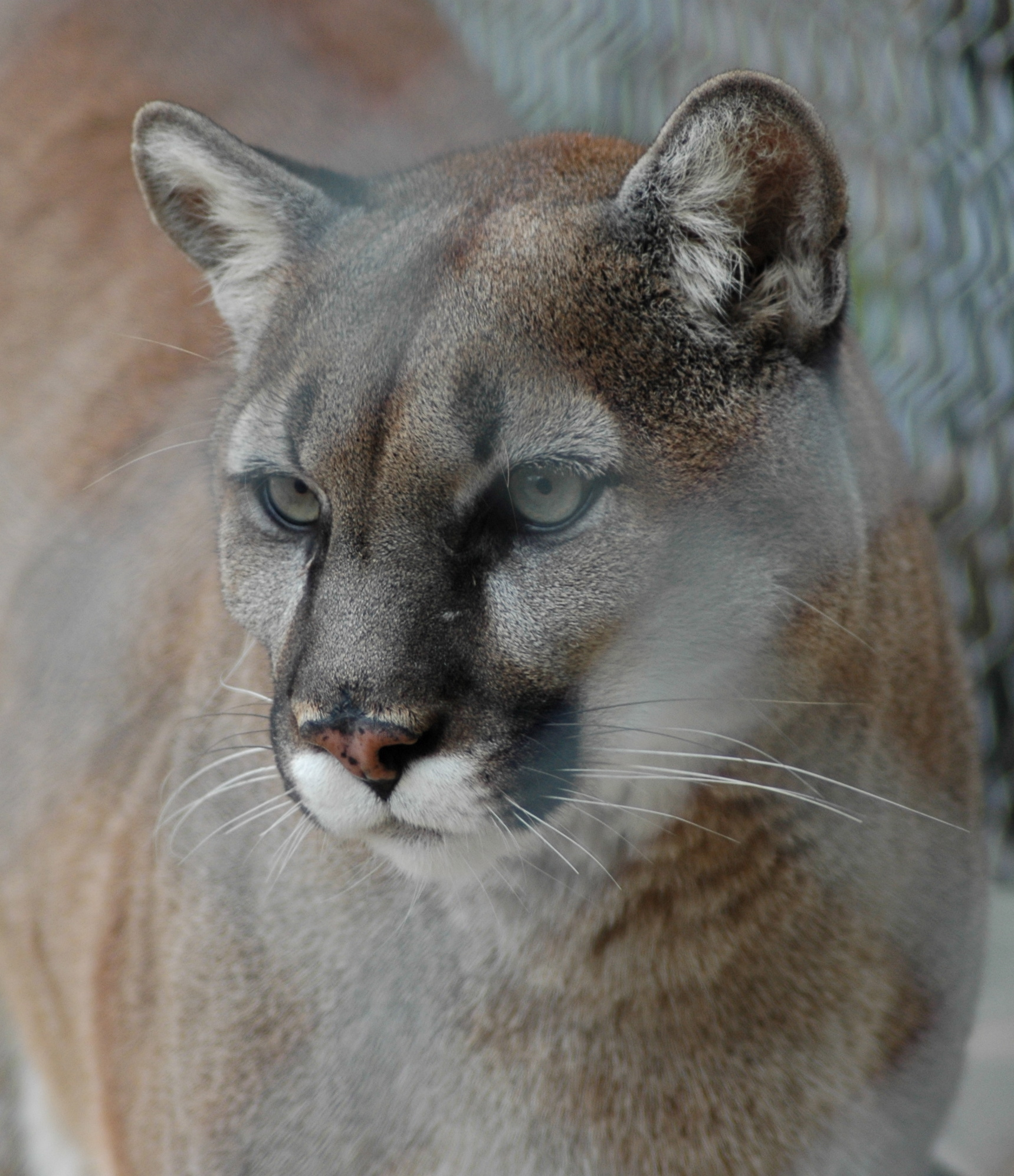
Cougar

The Austin Zoo has a circular layout featuring exotic and native species. Some notable exhibits are:

- Aviaries: Numerous aviary structures are located in between the bears and big cat exhibits. These are home to the grey parrot, Amazon parrot, jenday conure, sulphur-crested cockatoo, white umbrella cockatoo, military macaw, blue and gold macaw, and rainbow lorikeet.
- Big Cats: Multiple exhibits featuring African lions, cougars, bobcats, and tigers. A white tiger named Zulema was added in 2020 after being rescued by the DEA.
- Capybaras and Bears: The central zoo area is home to the capybara, American black bear and fox.
- Dairy Barn: Farm animal area where visitors are able to feed Boer goats, Nigerian dwarf goats, pigs, pygmy goats, and sheep. Surrounding the barnyard are the emu, zebra, ostrich, axis deer, and llama habitats.
- Primate Palace: Contains animals such as the capuchin monkey, loris, patas monkey, colobus monkey, and ring-tailed lemur.
- Tortoise Barn: Large barn and barnyard home to the Galápagos tortoise.
- Train Depot: The train depot provides rides on a children's train to the east of the park. The American alligator habitat is in this area.
- Reptile House: Indoor area for reptiles and arachnids.

== Land usage ==
Austin Zoo owns 54 acres of land. Currently, 16 acres have been developed and house the Zoo's animal collection. The additional acreage will be used to allow expansion of the zoo as needs change.
