= Silver fox (animal) =

Melanistic form of red fox

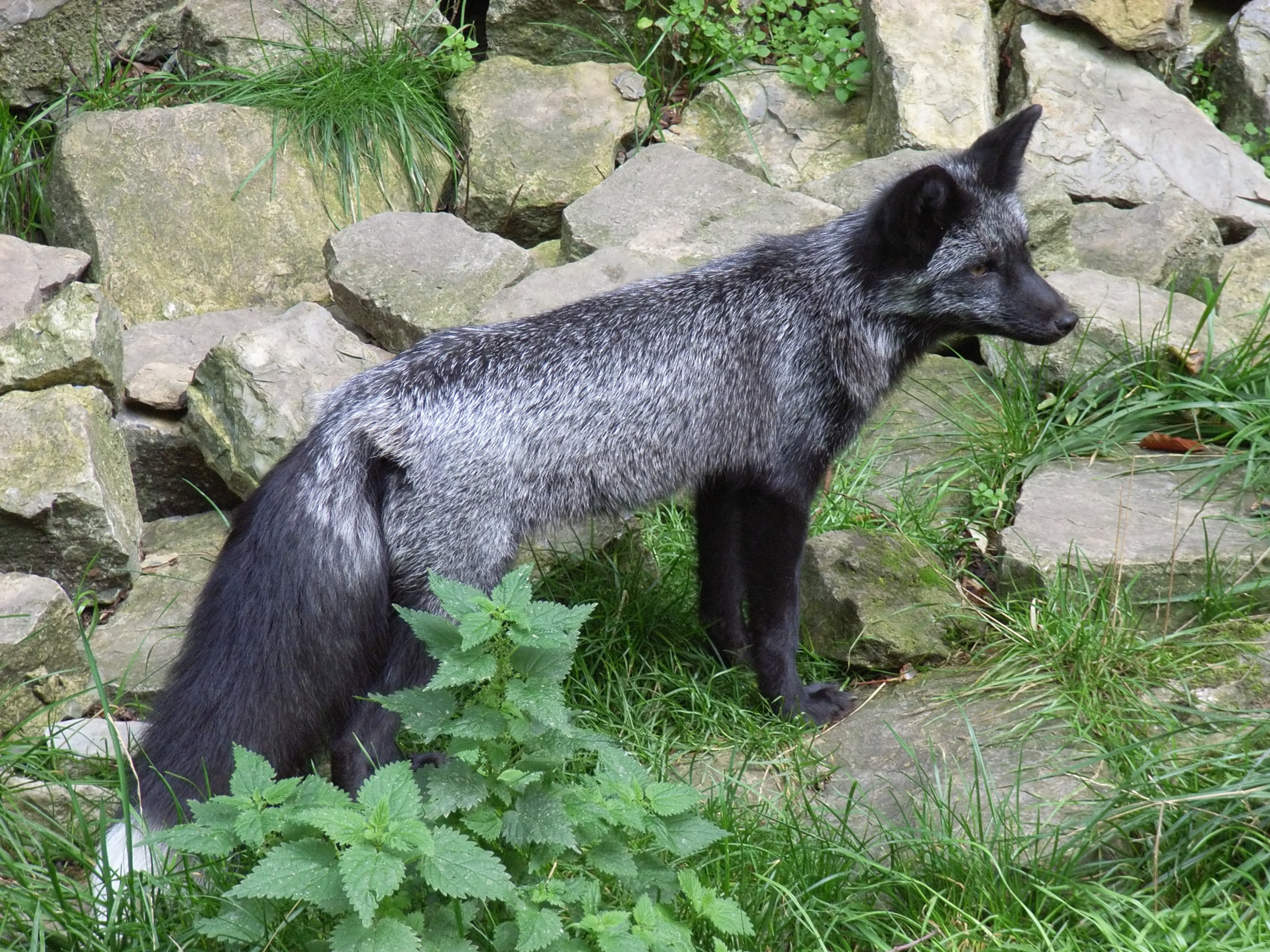
A silver fox

The silver fox, sometimes referred to as the black fox, or blue fox, is a melanistic form of the red fox (Vulpes vulpes). Silver foxes display a great deal of pelt variation. Some are completely glossy black except for a white colouration on the tip of the tail, giving them a somewhat silvery appearance. Some silver foxes are bluish-grey, and some may have a cinereous colour on the sides.

Historically, silver foxes were among the most valued fur-bearers, and their pelts were frequently worn by nobles in Russia, Western Europe, and China. Wild silver foxes do not naturally reproduce exclusively with members of the same coat morph and can be littermates with the common red variety, although captive populations bred for the blue fox fur and as pets are almost exclusively mated with members of the same colour.

== Description ==
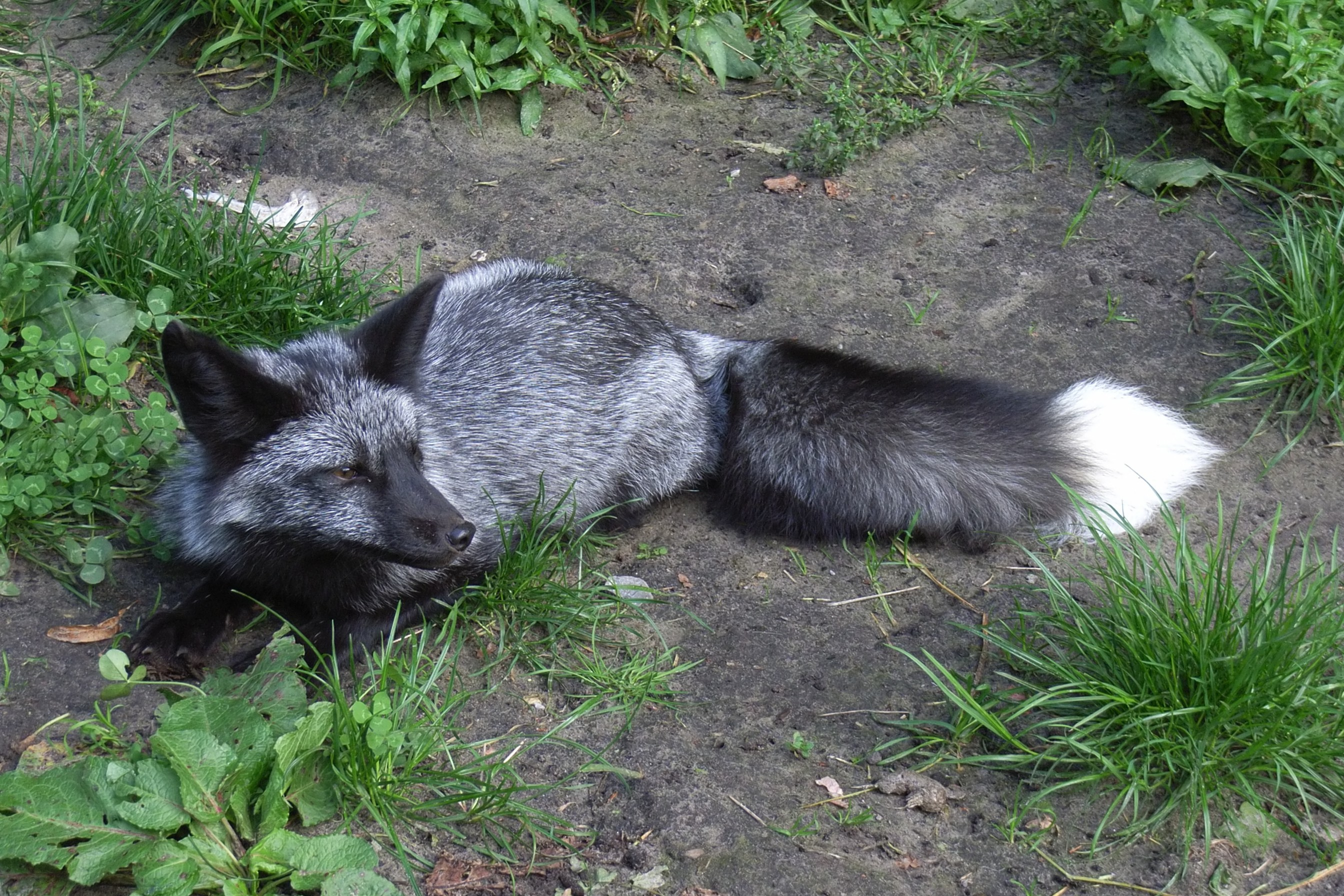
An adult silver fox

The silver fox's long outer hair can extend as much as five centimetres (two inches) beyond the shorter underfur on different parts of the fox's body, particularly under the throat, behind the shoulders, on the sides and the tail. The hair of the underfur is brown at the base, and silver-grey tipped with black further along the follicle. The hair is soft, glossy and was once reputed to be finer than that of the pine marten. The uniformly blackish brown or chocolate coloured underfur, which is unusually long and dense, measures in some places five centimetres (two inches) and is exceedingly fine. It surrounds the whole body even to the tail, where it is a little coarser and woollier. The fur is shortest on the forehead and limbs, and is finer on the fox's underbelly. When viewed individually, the hairs composing the belly fur exhibit a wavy appearance. There are scarcely any long hairs on the ears, which are thickly clothed with fur. The soles of the feet are so thickly covered with woolly hair that no callous spots are visible. Silver foxes tend to be more cautious than red foxes.

When bred with another member of the same colour morph, silver foxes will produce silver-coated offspring, with little variation in this trend after the third generation. When mated to pure red foxes, the resulting cubs will be red in overall coat colour, and will have blacker markings on the belly, neck and points than average red foxes. When one red fox of such a pedigree is mated with a silver one, the litter is almost always 50% silver and 50% red, manifesting as a Mendelian incomplete dominant trait. Red morph parents may occasionally produce a silver cub, the usual proportion being one in four. Occasionally, the colours of mixed foxes blend rather than segregate.

Dark colour in the Alaskan silver fox is caused by a mutation to MC1R, while in the standard silver fox the dark colour is caused by a recessive mutation to agouti.

== Range ==
Red foxes are one of the most widely distributed carnivorous species in the world, ranging over much of the northern hemisphere and Australia. Their abundance in a wide variety of habitats can be attributed to introduction by humans into new habitats for fox-hunting.

In North America, silver foxes occur mostly in the northeastern part of the continent. In the 19th century, silver foxes were sometimes collected from Labrador, the Magdalen Islands, and they were rarely taken from the mountainous regions of Pennsylvania and the wilder portions of New York. They were occasionally found in Nova Scotia and New Brunswick. According to Sir John Richardson, it was uncommon for trappers to collect more than 4–5 silver foxes in any one season, in areas where silver foxes were present, despite the trappers' tendency to prioritize them above all other fur-bearers once they were discovered. Silver foxes comprise up to 8% of Canada's red fox population.

In the former Soviet Union, silver foxes inhabit mostly the forest zones and forest–tundra belts, particularly the central and eastern parts of Siberia and the Caucasus mountains. They are very rare in steppes and deserts.

== History of fur use ==
In the richness and beauty of its splendid fur the silver-grey Fox surpasses the beaver or sea otter, and the skins are indeed so highly esteemed that the finest command extraordinary prices, and are always in demand.

— John James Audubon, quoted from The Imperial Collection of Audubon Animals, 1967

=== Pelt standards ===
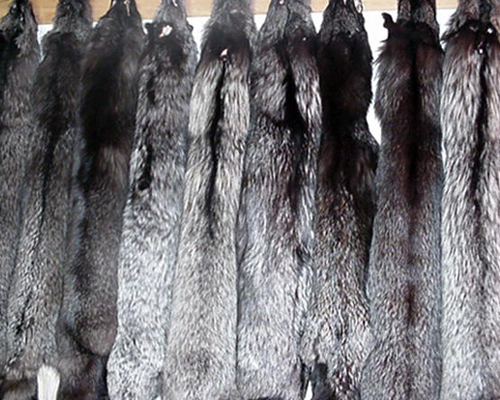
Silver fox furs

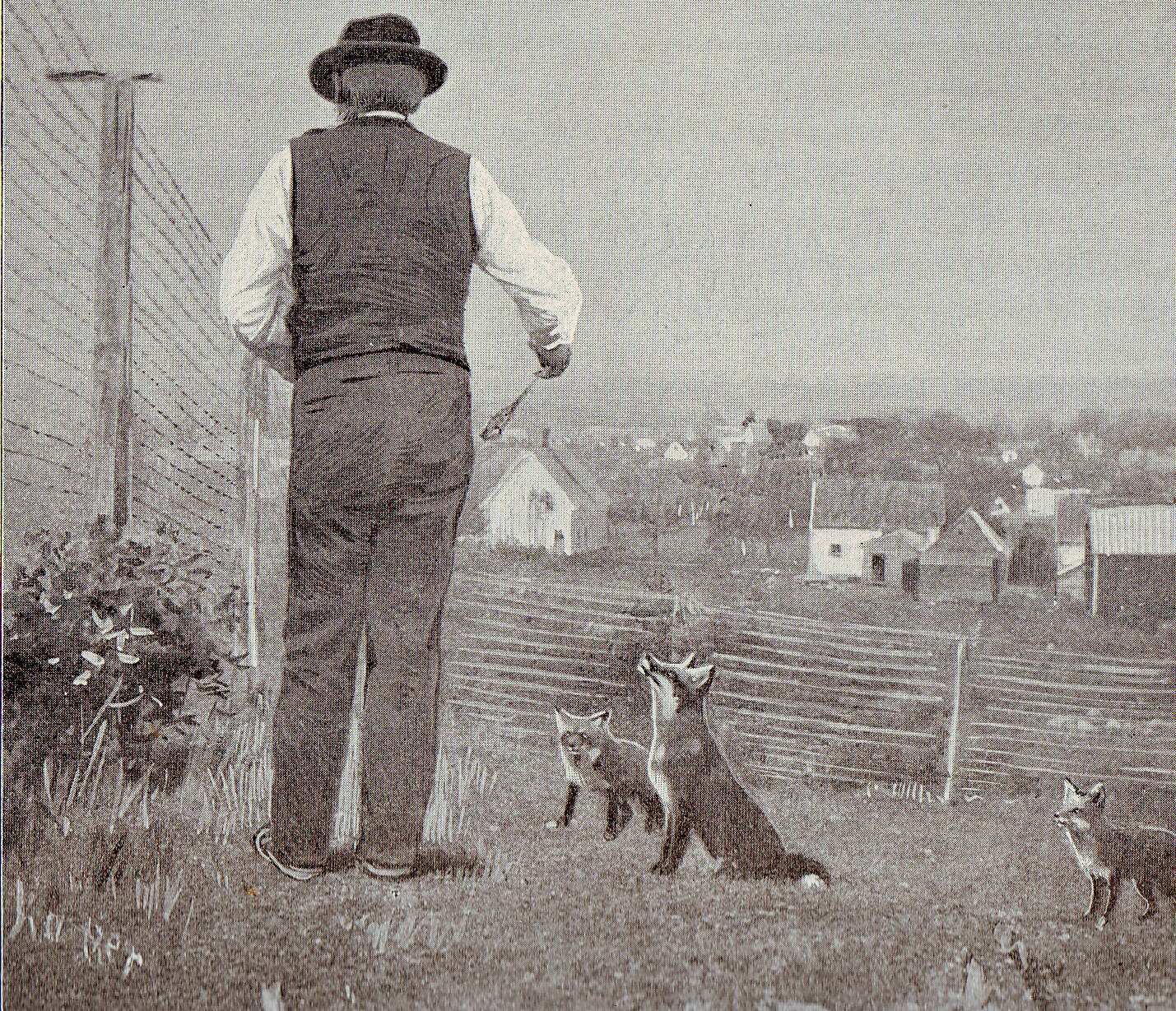
Captive silver foxes being fed

For the pelt to be considered of suitable quality, certain criteria must be met: There must be a section of glossy black fur on the neck with a bluish cast. The silvery hairs must contain pure bands that are neither white nor prominent. The most valued furs had an even distribution of silvery hair, as patches of silvery hair gave the coat a flaky appearance, which was considered undesirable. The fur must have "silkiness", which refers to the softness of the fur, and was judged by a client running his hand over the pelt. The coat must have a sheen, which reflects the health of the coat and the animal from which it came, as well as the finesse of the hairs. The fur must weigh at least one pound, with value increasing along with size. Heavy fur is considered to be more durable and handsome.

=== In North America ===
The fur of a silver fox was once considered by the natives of New England to be worth more than 40 American beaver skins. A chieftain accepting a gift of silver fox furs was seen as an act of reconciliation. The records of the Hudson's Bay Company indicate that 19–25% of fox skins traded in British Columbia in the years 1825–1850 were silver, as were 16% of those traded in Labrador. The fur was almost always sold to Russian and Chinese traders.

The silver fur of this fox was the most sought-after pelt due to its colour and style. In 1830, the allele frequency for a silver pelt was at 15% but due to overhunting, this number had fallen to 5% in 1930. The silver pelt is still hunted for and the population of foxes with this silver pelt continues to fall. Before the practice of fur farming was eventually refined on Prince Edward Island, it was standard practice to release free-ranging silver foxes into small islands, where they quickly starved to death.

Fur farmers on Prince Edward Island gained success by breeding and caring for their foxes in captivity. Charles Dalton and Robert Oulton began crossbreeding experiments in 1894. The farmers recognized the foxes' monogamous habits and permitted their studs to mate for life with a single female, contributing to their success. The fur of captive-bred foxes was of better quality than that of free-ranging ones (worth $500–1,000 rather than $20–30) because of improved care and diet. These silver foxes were bred strictly with members of their own colour morph, and by the third generation, all residual traces of red or cross ancestry disappeared. The silver fox price boom in North America ended in 1914, but by 1921, there were 300 farms throughout the USA.

A well-known silver fox ranch of North America was that of Fred Colpitts from Salisbury, New Brunswick. Known as the "Colpitts Brothers", Fred and James raised silver foxes in the early 1920s and used selective breeding to refine the fox colour. Fred developed the Platinum fox (a colour variation of the silver fox) that was recognized for its unique colour and markings worldwide. These Platinum foxes brought top dollar from sales in Montreal, New York and London, with one pair of foxes selling for $5000, and winning major awards at shows across Canada, the two brothers sold foxes for breeding stock throughout North America.

In the 1930s, scientific advances led to increases in fox health. The Fromm brothers funded the development of the distemper vaccine and vitamin D tablets to prevent the foxes from getting rickets. They also allowed the foxes to roam relatively free as they would otherwise damage their pelts and they were fed daily. The largest silver fox the Fromms' had was over 20 pounds (9.1 kg).

=== In Eurasia ===
Silver foxes in Russian fur farms are of North American stock, and are selectively bred in order to remove as much brown from the fur as possible, as the presence of brown fur lowers the pelt's value. Estonia began farming silver foxes in 1924, after receiving 2,500 foundation specimens from Norway to Mustajõe farm. The numbers of Estonian silver fox farms steadily increased in the following decades. During the Soviet period, the silver fox industry boomed due to government subsidies and a focus on selectively breeding foxes for greater fertility rather than fur quality.

== Behaviour ==
The silver fox morph is behaviourally similar to the red morph. One common behaviour is scent marking. This behaviour is used as a display of dominance, but may also be used to communicate the absence of food from foraging areas as well as social records.

=== Mating behaviour ===
Silver foxes exist in seasonally monogamous pairs for the breeding months of December to April, and most matings occur in January and February. Female silver foxes are monestrous (having one estrus cycle per year) with estrus lasting 1–6 days and parturition occurring after about 52 days of gestation. During or approaching estrus, the vulva of silver foxes increases in size and tumescence, indicating the sexual readiness or condition of the fox.

Female silver foxes generally breed during their first autumn, but a number of factors contribute to their breeding success. These include age, food, population density, and the mating system (polygyny or monogamy). Higher population density leads to a higher incidence of failure in producing pups. Silver foxes have litters that typically range from 1 to 14 pups, with the average being 3 to 6 pups. Litter size generally increases with age and abundance of food. Scientists have observed an increase in reproductive success with age in silver fox morphs, which may be attributable to yearlings breeding an average of nine days after adults. Success in larger litters depends highly on the availability of extra-parental care via the assistance of unmated females. This is especially the case in higher density populations, where some females fail to produce pups.

Silver foxes engage in a system of bi-parental care, which is associated with their seasonal monogamous mating scheme. For a given litter, males contribute a large investment in the offspring by both feeding and protecting the den. While the pups are early in development, the male secures food for the nursing vixen. Whereas males are more vigilant in defending the den, females also defend their offspring aggressively.

==== Competition capacity ====
In captivity, differential reproductive success can be attributed to variation in the competition capacity among individual females. Competition capacity is defined as the ability of individuals to dominate resources such as food or nesting sites. The competition capacity of the mother directly influences the fitness of her offspring. In one experiment where vixens (whose competition capacities were categorized as high, medium, or low) were bred under standard farming conditions, competition capacity was positively associated with the number of healthy offspring raised to weaning. The findings have led to the use of competition capacity as a more encompassing measure of reproductive fitness for the silver fox, and the revelation that some vixens engage in infanticide. The vixens generated more weaned cubs during their next reproductive cycle than those who did not engage in infanticide. This may suggest the conservation of efforts or investment to increase future reproductive success. Infanticidal vixens infrequently adopt and help to raise the young of neighboring vixens after eating their own.

=== Feeding ===
While silver foxes are opportunistic feeders and will consume any food presented to them, they prefer a more carnivorous diet when meat is available. When meat is scarce, they rely more heavily on plant material. Like the red morph, the silver fox adapts different strategies when hunting different prey. When hunting smaller mammals, the foxes adopt a "mousing position" from which they can locate prey based on sound. They launch themselves, pin prey to the ground using their forepaws, and kill it by biting. Quicker terrestrial prey requires more practiced behaviour, often involving stalking and rapid pursuit. When prey escapes to hidden caches or burrows, foxes are known to occasionally nap beside the entrances and lie in wait for prey to reemerge.

== Domestication ==
The domesticated silver fox is a form of the silver fox which has been domesticated—to some extent—under laboratory conditions. Domesticated silver foxes are the result of an experiment which was designed to demonstrate the power of selective breeding to transform species, as described by Charles Darwin in On the Origin of Species. The experiment explored whether selection for behaviour rather than morphology may have been the process that had produced dogs from wolves, by recording the changes in foxes when in each generation only the most tame foxes were allowed to breed. Many of the descendant foxes became both tamer and more dog-like in morphology, including displaying mottled or spotted coloured fur.

== In culture ==
The silver fox appears in the stories of many cultures. The Achomawi people of Northern California tell a myth about two creators: the wise silver fox stemming from fog and the amoral trickster coyote from the clouds. The myth reveals that while the coyote slept, the silver fox used its hair combings to create landmasses. It then thought of trees, rocks, fruits, and other resources, and created those too. However, the coyote could not employ self-control and ate everything up at will after it awoke. The story tells a moral lesson, portraying the silver fox as a wise being and creator of sorts while suggesting the coyote as a lazy, greedy and impulsive animal. Similarly, the silver fox has often been represented on totem poles.

The silver fox also appears as a symbol on the Prince Edward Island coat of arms. In the late 1800s, the rare silver fox was native to the region, and its pelt was highly valued around the world. Scientific developments for breeding fur-bearing animals took place on the island. Fur farming became an important part of the 20th century economy of the province and Wisconsin. The Fromm brothers started their fur trading company in Central Wisconsin in the 1930s, which led to the development of the distemper vaccine. The silver fox has come to symbolize the wit and wisdom of the islanders. Its fur-breeding history resulted in its status as a symbol for the ingenuity and perseverance involved in the industry.

The silver fox has also been represented in different forms of media. On television, in films, and in comic books, Silver Fox is a character in the Wolverine superhero series. In cartoon, the characters Scarface, Lady Blue and their children from TV animated series The Animals of Farthing Wood are silver foxes.

== See also ==
- Cross fox
- Domesticated silver fox
- List of domesticated animals
- Experimental evolution
- Genomics of domestication
- Neoteny
