= Institute of Cytology and Genetics =

Russian research institute

Institute of Cytology and Genetics of the Siberian Branch of the Russian Academy of Sciences
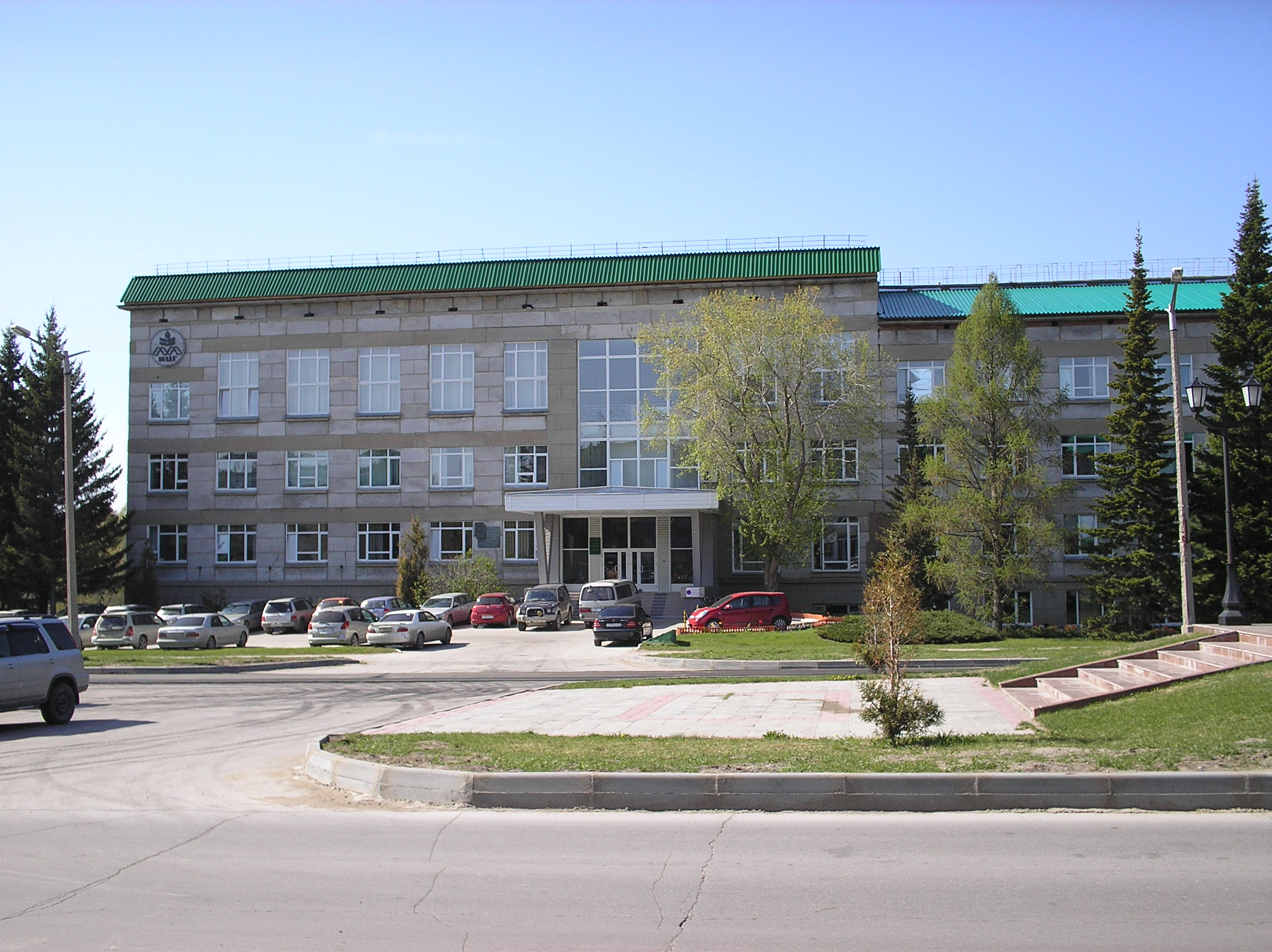
- Established: 1957
- Director: Sergey Lavryushev
- Staff: 1,589
- Owner: Siberian Branch of the Russian Academy of Sciences
- Address: Lavrentyev Prospekt, 10, Novosibirsk, 630090, Russia
- Location: Novosibirsk, Russia
- Website: http://www.bionet.nsc.ru

Institute of Cytology and Genetics of the Siberian Branch of the Russian Academy of Sciences (Russian: Институт цитологии и генетики СО РАН) is a research institute based in Novosibirsk, Russia. It was founded in 1957.

== Experiments ==
- Fox domestication experiment

== Magazines ==
- Vavilov's Journal of Genetics and Breeders
- Ateroskleroz
- The Siberian Scientific Medical Journal

== Monuments and memorials ==
- Monument to the laboratory mouse
- Memorial to Dmitriy Belyaev and Domesticated Fox

== Gallery ==
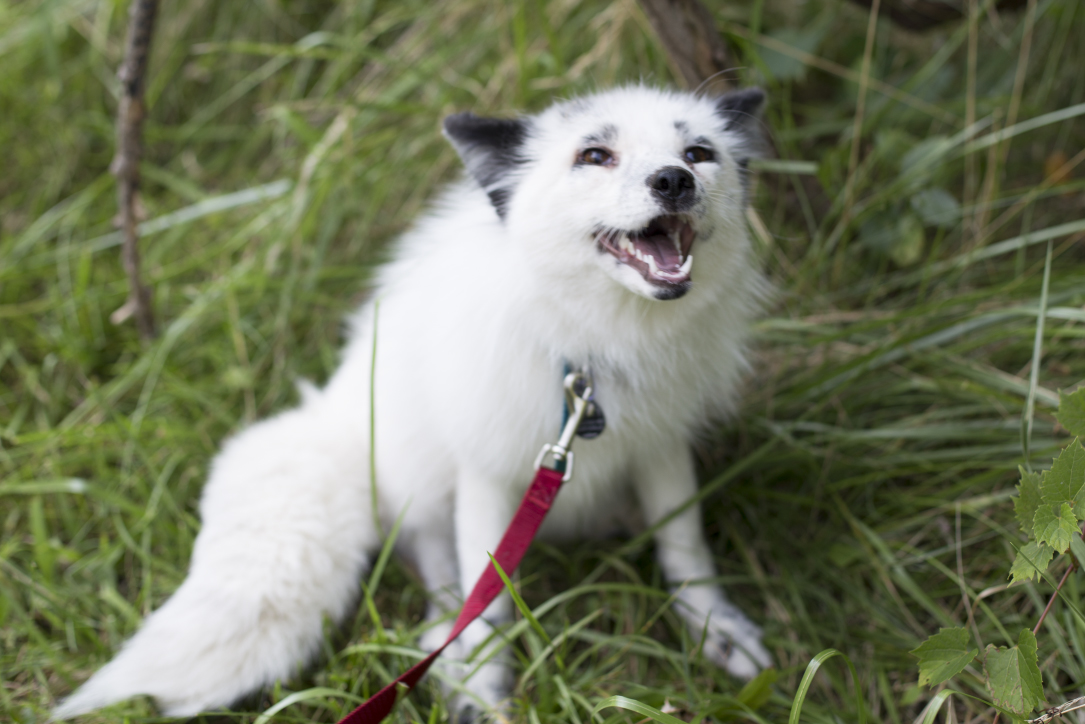
A Russian domesticated red fox with Georgian white fur color.
