= Tame animal =

Trained animal

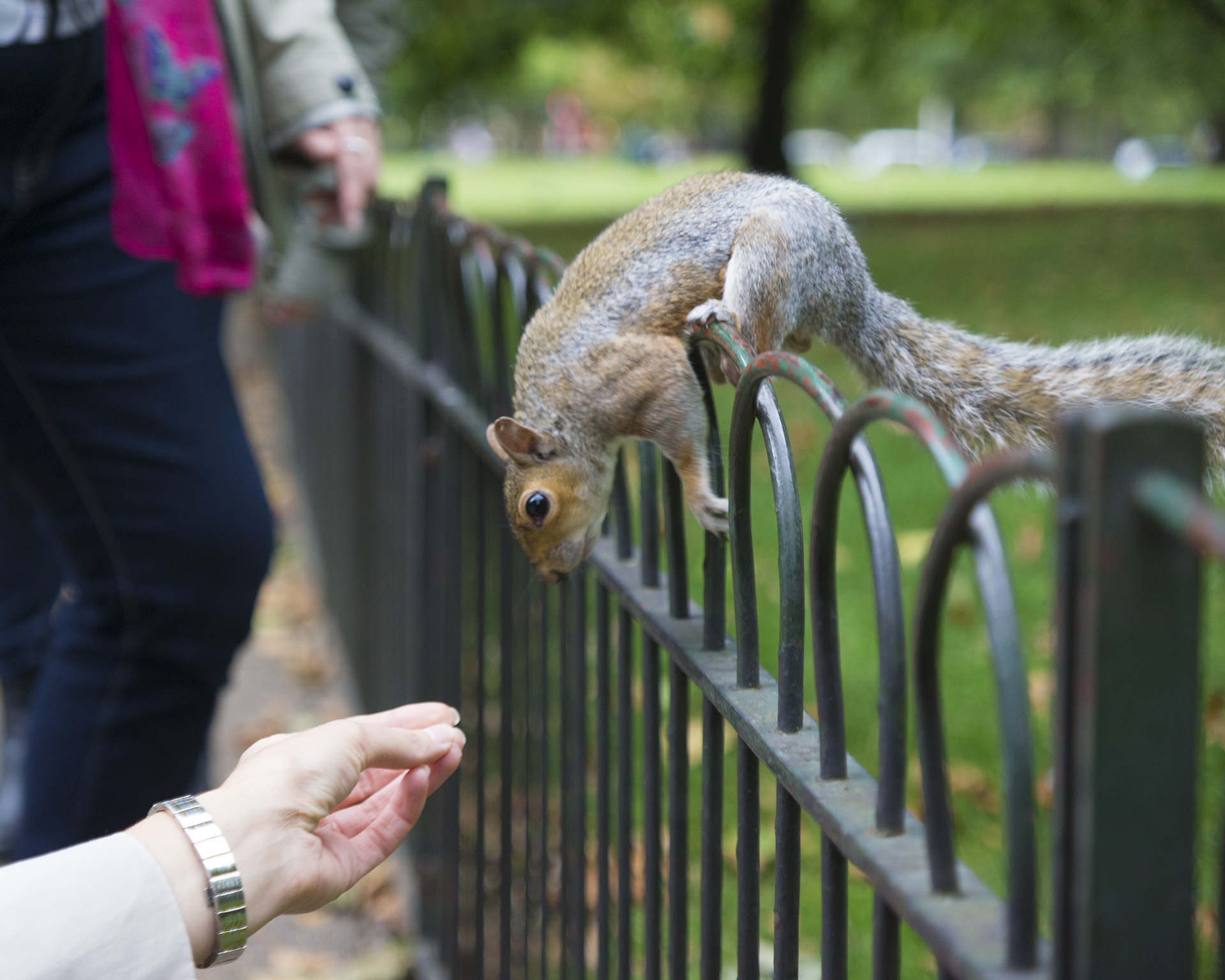
In public parks, some wild animals, such as this eastern grey squirrel, have been sufficiently tamed so as to lose their natural fear of humans.

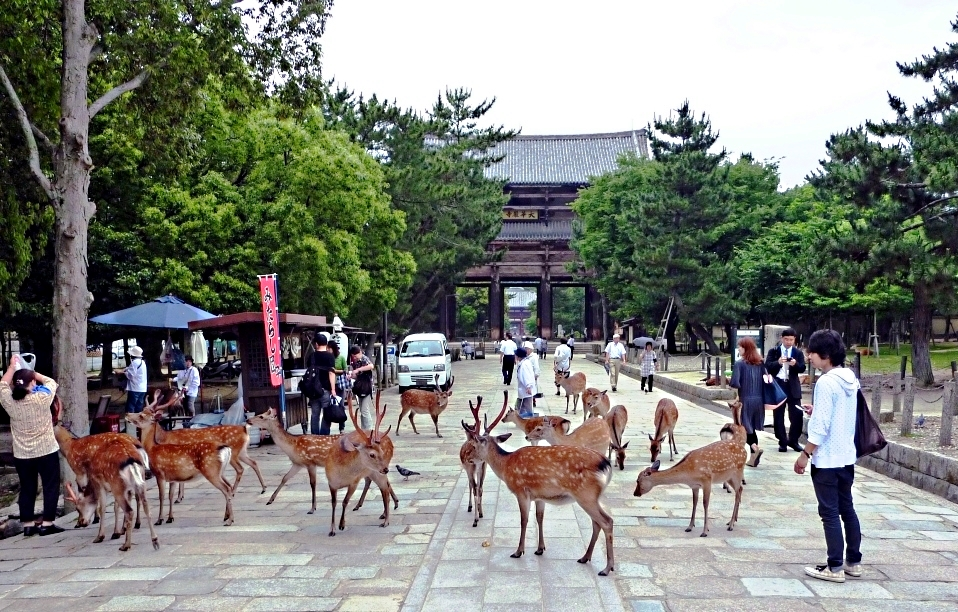
Tame deer in Nara

A tame animal is an animal that is relatively tolerant of human presence. Tameness may arise naturally (as in the case, for example, of island tameness) or due to the deliberate, human-directed process of training an animal against its initially wild or natural instincts to avoid or attack humans. The tameability of an animal is the level of ease it takes humans to train the animal, and varies among individual animals, breeds, or species.

In the English language, "taming" and "domestication" refer to two partially overlapping but distinct concepts. For example feral animals are domesticated, but not tamed. Similarly, taming is not the same as animal training, although in some contexts these terms may be used interchangeably.

Taming implies that the animal tolerates not merely human proximity, but at minimum human touching. Yet, more common usage limits the label "tame" to animals which do not threaten or injure humans who do not harm or threaten them. Tameness, in this sense, should be distinguished from "socialization" wherein the animals treat humans much like conspecifics, for instance by trying to dominate humans.

== Taming versus domestication ==
Domestication and taming are related but distinct concepts. Taming is the conditioned behavioral modification of a wild-born animal when its natural avoidance of humans is reduced and it accepts the presence of humans, but domestication is the permanent genetic modification of a bred lineage that leads to an inherited predisposition toward humans. Human selection included tameness, but domestication is not achieved without a suitable evolutionary response.

Domestic animals do not need to be tame in the behavioral sense, such as the Spanish fighting bull. Wild animals can be tame, such as a hand-raised cheetah. A domestic animal's breeding is controlled by humans and its tameness and tolerance of humans is genetically determined. Thus, an animal bred in captivity is not necessarily domesticated; tigers, gorillas, and polar bears breed readily in captivity but are not domesticated. Asian elephants are wild animals that with taming manifest outward signs of domestication, yet their breeding is not human controlled and thus they are not true domesticates.

== See also ==
- Dressage and reining for horses
- Lion taming
- Tame bear
- Tame elephant
- Animals in professional wrestling

== Sources ==
- Geist, V (2011a). "Wildlife habituation: advances in understanding and management application". Human–Wildlife Interactions. 5: 9–12.
- Geist, V (2011b). "Response to Rogers and Mansfield (2011) and Stringham (2011)". Human–Wildlife Interactions. 5 (2): 192–196.
- Herrero, S.; Smith, T.; DeBruyn, T.; Gunther, K.; Matt, C. (2005). "From the field: Brown bear habituation to people – safety, risks, and benefits". Wildlife Society Bulletin. 33 (1): 362–373. doi:10.2193/0091-7648(2005)33[362:ftfbbh]2.0.co;2.
- Rogers, L. L.; Mansfield, S. A. (2011). "Misconceptions about black bears: a response to Geist (2011)". Human–Wildlife Interactions. 5 (2): 173–176.
- Smith, T.; Herrero, S.; DeBruyn, T.; et al. (2005). "Alaskan brown bears, humans, and habituation". Ursus. 16 (1): 1–10. doi:10.2192/1537-6176(2005)016[0001:abbhah]2.0.co;2.
- Stringham, S. F. 2010. When Bears Whisper, Do You Listen? WildWatch, Soldotna, AK.
- Stringham, S. F (2011). "ikikAggressive body language of bears and wildlife viewing: a response to Geist (2011)". Human-wildlife Interactions. 5 (2): 177–191.
