= SH4 =

SH4 or SH-4 may refer to:

- State Highway 4, see List of highways numbered 4, a common highway name in many countries
- SH-4 microprocessor architecture
- Silent Hill 4: The Room, the fourth installment in the Silent Hill video game series
- Silent Hunter 4: Wolves of the Pacific, the fourth installment in the Silent Hunter video game series
- sh4, gene controlling shattering in the Poaceae, selected against in the domestication syndrome and selected for in the agricultural weed syndrome
