= Domestication of vertebrates =

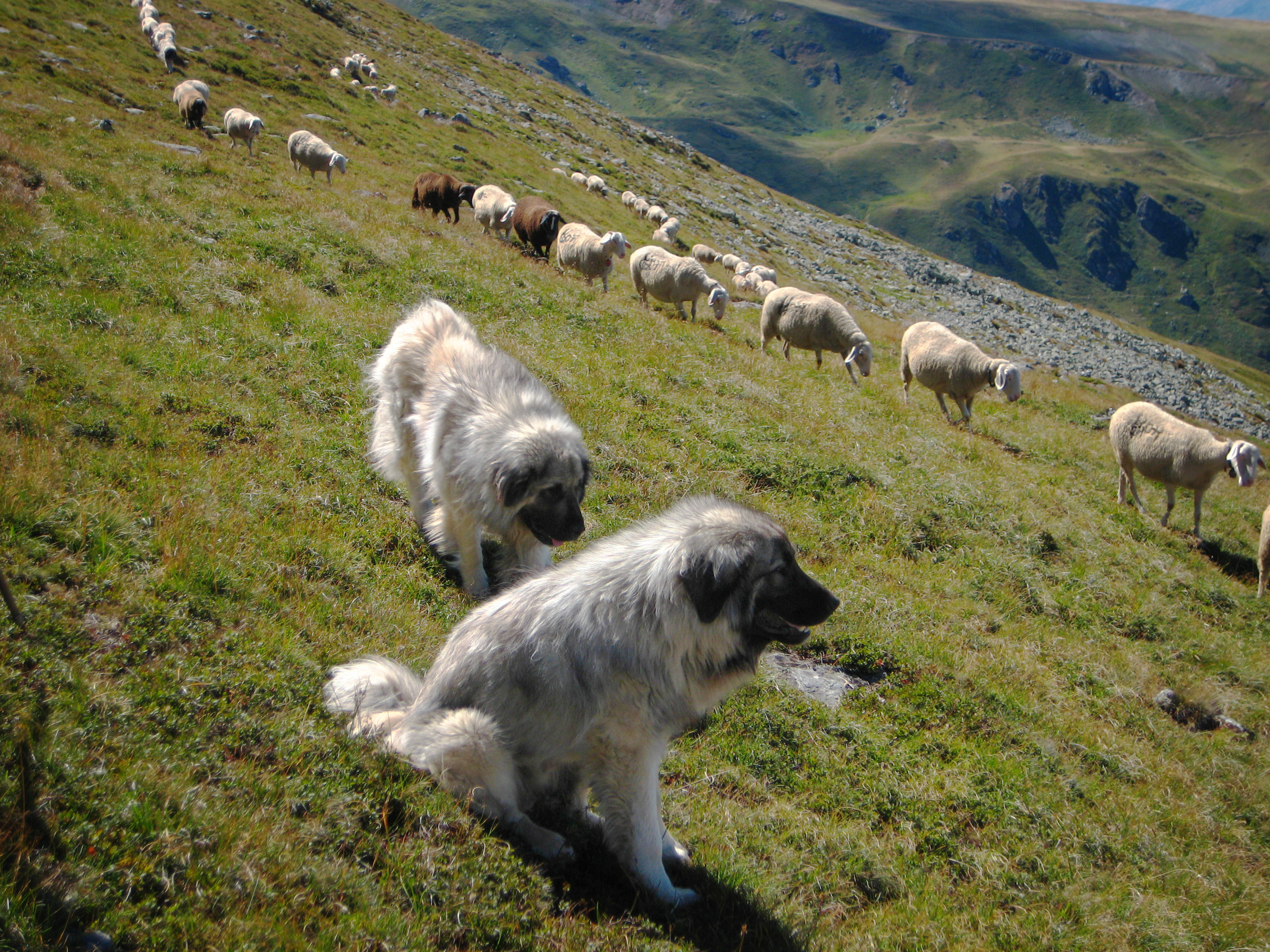
Dogs and sheep were among the first animals to be domesticated.

The domestication of vertebrates is the mutual relationship between vertebrate animals, including birds and mammals, and the humans who influence their care and reproduction.

Charles Darwin recognized a small number of traits that made domesticated species different from their wild ancestors. He was also the first to recognize the difference between conscious selective breeding (i.e. artificial selection) in which humans directly select for desirable traits, and unconscious selection where traits evolve as a by-product of natural selection or from selection of other traits. There is a genetic difference between domestic and wild populations. There is also a genetic difference between the domestication traits that researchers believe to have been essential at the early stages of domestication, and the improvement traits that have appeared since the split between wild and domestic populations. Domestication traits are generally fixed within all domesticates, and were selected during the initial episode of domestication of that animal or plant, whereas improvement traits are present only in a portion of domesticates, though they may be fixed in individual breeds or regional populations.

Domestication should not be confused with taming. Taming is the conditioned behavioral modification of a wild-born animal when its natural avoidance of humans is reduced and it accepts the presence of humans, but domestication is the permanent genetic modification of a bred lineage that leads to an inherited predisposition toward humans. Certain animal species, and certain individuals within those species, make better candidates for domestication than others because they exhibit certain behavioral characteristics: (1) the size and organization of their social structure; (2) the availability and the degree of selectivity in their choice of mates; (3) the ease and speed with which the parents bond with their young, and the maturity and mobility of the young at birth; (4) the degree of flexibility in diet and habitat tolerance; and (5) responses to humans and new environments, including flight responses and reactivity to external stimuli.

It is proposed that there were three major pathways that most animal domesticates followed into domestication: (1) commensals, adapted to a human niche (e.g., dogs, cats, fowl, possibly pigs); (2) animals sought for food and other byproducts (e.g., sheep, goats, cattle, water buffalo, yak, pig, reindeer, llama, alpaca, and turkey); and (3) targeted animals for draft and nonfood resources (e.g., horse, donkey, camel). The dog was the first to be domesticated, and domestic dogs were established across Eurasia before the end of the Late Pleistocene era, well before the first cultivation and before the domestication of any other animals. Unlike other domestic species, which were primarily selected for production-related traits, dogs were initially selected for their behaviors. Archaeological and genetic data suggest that long-term bidirectional gene flow between wild and domestic stocks was common in some species, including donkeys, horses, New and Old World camelids, goats, sheep, and pigs. One study has concluded that human selection for domestic traits likely counteracted the homogenizing effect of gene flow from wild boars into pigs and created domestication islands in the genome. The same process may also apply to other domesticated animals. Some of the most commonly domesticated animals are cats and dogs.

== Definitions ==
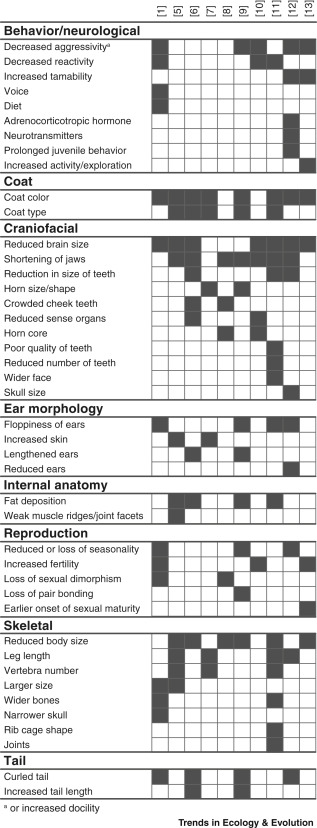
Traits used to define the animal domestication syndrome

=== Domestication ===
Domestication has been defined as "a sustained multi-generational, mutualistic relationship in which one organism assumes a significant degree of influence over the reproduction and care of another organism in order to secure a more predictable supply of a resource of interest, and through which the partner organism gains advantage over individuals that remain outside this relationship, thereby benefitting and often increasing the fitness of both the domesticator and the target domesticate." This definition recognizes both the biological and the cultural components of the domestication process and the effects on both humans and the domesticated animals and plants. All past definitions of domestication have included a relationship between humans with plants and animals, but their differences lay in who was considered as the lead partner in the relationship. This new definition recognizes a mutualistic relationship in which both partners gain benefits. Domestication has vastly enhanced the reproductive output of crop plants, livestock, and pets far beyond that of their wild progenitors. Domesticates have provided humans with resources that they could more predictably and securely control, move, and redistribute, which has been the advantage that had fueled a population explosion of the agro-pastoralists and their spread to all corners of the planet.

=== Domestication syndrome ===
Domestication syndrome is a term often used to describe the suite of phenotypic traits arising during domestication that distinguish crops from their wild ancestors. The term is also applied to animals and includes increased docility and tameness, coat color changes, reductions in tooth size, changes in craniofacial morphology, alterations in ear and tail form (e.g., floppy ears), more frequent and nonseasonal estrus cycles, alterations in adrenocorticotropic hormone levels, changed concentrations of several neurotransmitters, prolongations in juvenile behavior, and reductions in both total brain size and of particular brain regions. The set of traits used to define the animal domestication syndrome is inconsistent.

=== Difference from taming ===
Domestication should not be confused with taming. Taming is the conditioned behavioral modification of a wild-born animal when its natural avoidance of humans is reduced and it accepts the presence of humans, but domestication is the permanent genetic modification of a bred lineage that leads to an inherited predisposition toward humans. Human selection included tameness, but without a suitable evolutionary response then domestication was not achieved. Domestic animals need not be tame in the behavioral sense, such as the Spanish fighting bull. Wild animals can be tame, such as a hand-raised cheetah. A domestic animal's breeding is controlled by humans and its tameness and tolerance of humans is genetically determined. However, an animal merely bred in captivity is not necessarily domesticated. Tigers, gorillas, and polar bears breed readily in captivity but are not domesticated. Asian elephants are wild animals that with taming manifest outward signs of domestication, yet their breeding is not human controlled and thus they are not true domesticates.

== History, cause and timing ==
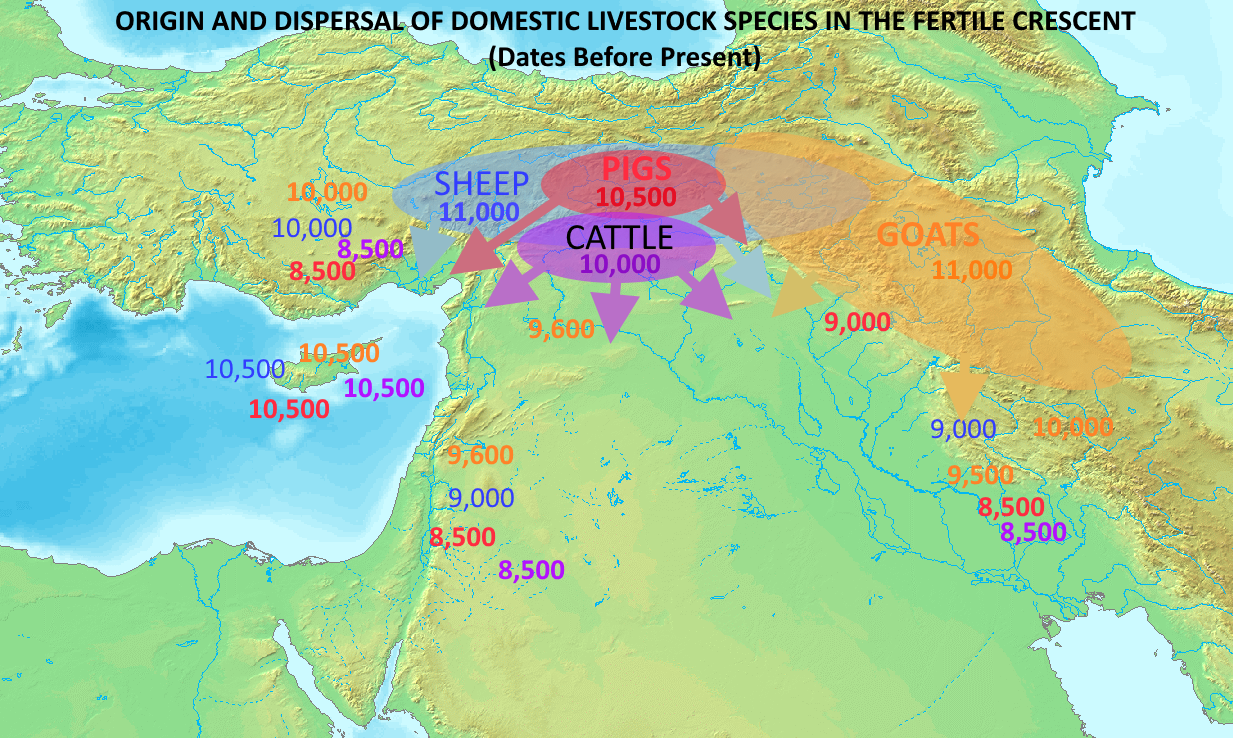
Origin and dispersal of domestic livestock species in the Fertile Crescent (dates Before Present).

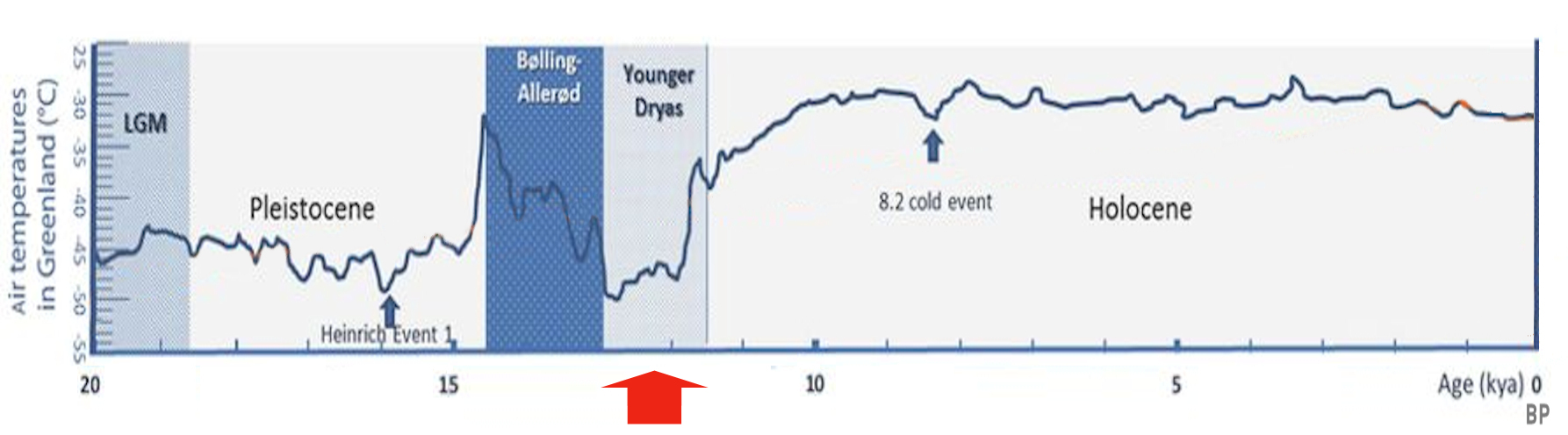
Evolution of temperatures in the postglacial period, after the Last Glacial Maximum, showing very low temperatures for the most part of the Younger Dryas, rapidly rising afterwards to reach the level of the warm Holocene, based on Greenland ice cores.

The domestication of animals and plants was triggered by the climatic and environmental changes that occurred after the peak of the Last Glacial Maximum around 21,000 years ago and which continue to this present day. These changes made obtaining food difficult. The Younger Dryas that occurred 12,900 years ago was a period of intense cold and aridity that put pressure on humans to intensify their foraging strategies. By the beginning of the Holocene from 11,700 years ago, favorable climatic conditions and increasing human populations led to small-scale animal and plant domestication, which allowed humans to augment the food that they were obtaining through hunter-gathering.

The increased use of agriculture and continued domestication of species during the Neolithic transition marked the beginning of a rapid shift in the evolution, ecology, and demography of both humans and numerous species of animals and plants. Areas with increasing agriculture underwent urbanization, developing higher-density populations and expanded economies, and became centers of livestock and crop domestication. Such agricultural societies emerged across Eurasia, North Africa, and South and Central America.

The first domesticate was the domestic dog (Canis lupus familiaris) from a wolf ancestor (Canis lupus) at least 15,000 years ago in northern Eurasia, prior to the end of the last ice age. As such, dogs were able to cross with humans into the Americas prior to the closure of the Bering Land Bridge, and they may have also been brought by migrating humans into Australia, becoming the ancestors of the present day dingo.

In the Fertile Crescent 10,000-11,000 years ago, zooarchaeology indicates that goats, pigs, sheep, and taurine cattle were the first livestock to be domesticated. Archaeologists working in Cyprus found an approximately 9500 year old burial ground containing an adult human with a feline skeleton. Two thousand years later, humped zebu cattle were domesticated in what is today Baluchistan in Pakistan. In East Asia 8,000 years ago, pigs were domesticated from wild boar that were genetically different from those found in the Fertile Crescent. The horse was domesticated on the Central Asian steppe 5,500 years ago. The chicken was domesticated in Southeast Asia 4,000 years ago.

There were also independent centers of animal domestication outside Eurasia. In the Peruvian Andes, the llama and alpaca were domesticated from the guanaco and vicuña respectively around 6,000-7,000 years ago. Despite their misleading geographical names, Guinea pigs were domesticated in the Andes 5,000-7,000 years ago, turkeys were domesticated in Mesoamerica 2,200-2,700 years ago, and Muscovy ducks were domesticated in the Andes as early as 50CE. Also around 2000 years before present, Guinea Fowl were domesticated in Africa in present day Mali and Sudan.

== Universal features ==
The biomass of wild vertebrates is declining relative to the biomass of domestic animals, with the calculated biomass of domestic cattle alone now being greater than that of all wild mammals combined. Because the evolution of domestic animals is ongoing, the process of domestication has a beginning but not an end. Various criteria have been established to provide a definition of domestic animals, but all decisions about exactly when an animal can be labelled "domesticated" in the zoological sense are arbitrary, although potentially useful. Domestication is a fluid and nonlinear process that may start, stop, reverse, or go down unexpected paths with no clear or universal threshold that separates the wild from the domestic. However, there are universal features held in common by all domesticated animals.

=== Behavioral preadaption ===
Certain animal species, and certain individuals within those species, make better candidates for domestication than others because they exhibit certain behavioral characteristics: (1) the size and organization of their social structure; (2) the availability and the degree of selectivity in their choice of mates; (3) the ease and speed with which the parents bond with their young, and the maturity and mobility of the young at birth; (4) the degree of flexibility in diet and habitat tolerance; and (5) responses to humans and new environments, including flight responses and reactivity to external stimuli. Reduced wariness to humans and low reactivity to both humans and other external stimuli are a key pre-adaptation for domestication, and these behaviors are also the primary target of the selective pressures experienced by the animal undergoing domestication. This implies that not all animals can be domesticated, e.g. a wild member of the horse family, the zebra.

Jared Diamond in his book Guns, Germs, and Steel enquired as to why, among the world's 148 large wild terrestrial herbivorous mammals, only 14 were domesticated, and proposed that their wild ancestors must have possessed six characteristics before they could be considered for domestication:

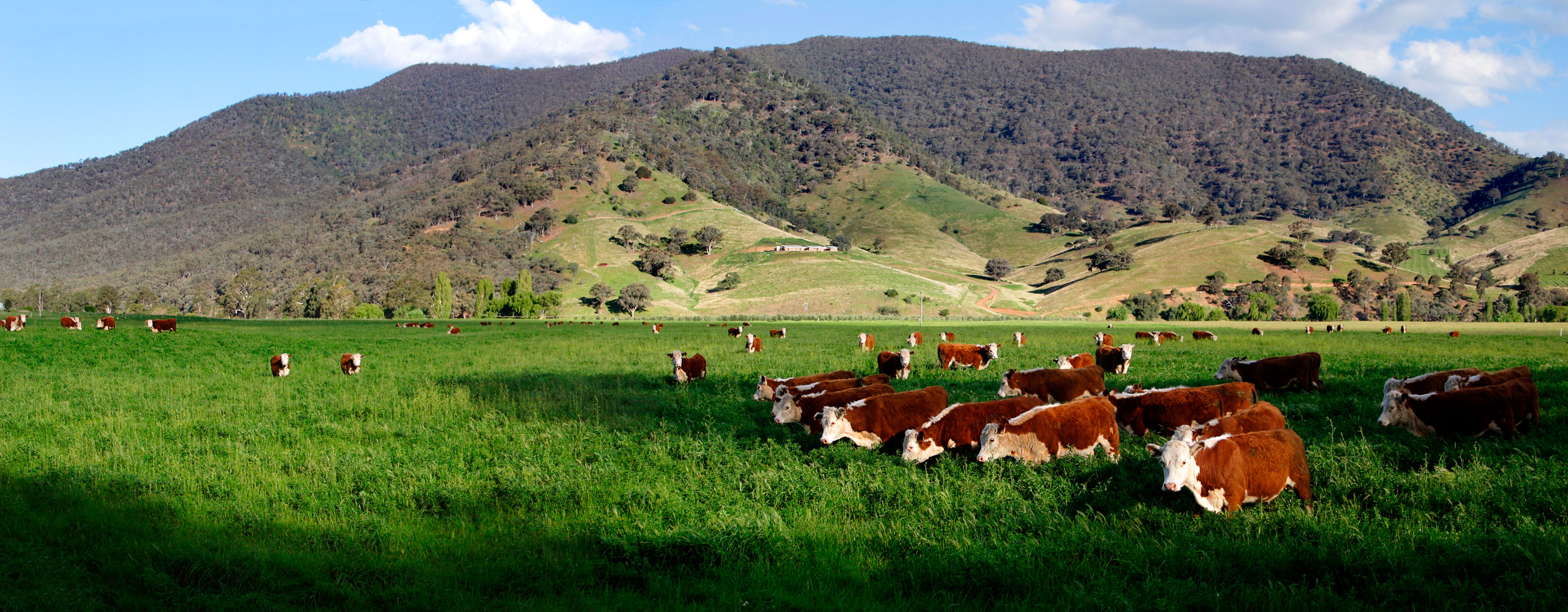
Hereford cattle, domesticated for beef production

1. Efficient diet – Animals that can efficiently process what they eat and live off plants are less expensive to keep in captivity. Carnivores feed on flesh, which would require the domesticators to raise additional animals to feed the carnivores and therefore increase the consumption of plants further.
2. Quick growth rate – Fast maturity rate compared to the human life span allows breeding intervention and makes the animal useful within an acceptable duration of caretaking. Some large animals require many years before they reach a useful size.
3. Ability to breed in captivity – Animals that will not breed in captivity are limited to acquisition through capture in the wild.
4. Pleasant disposition – Animals with nasty dispositions are dangerous to keep around humans.
5. Tendency not to panic – Some species are nervous, fast, and prone to flight when they perceive a threat.
6. Social structure – All species of domesticated large mammals had wild ancestors that lived in herds with a dominance hierarchy amongst the herd members, and the herds had overlapping home territories rather than mutually exclusive home territories. This arrangement allows humans to take control of the dominance hierarchy.

=== Brain size and function ===
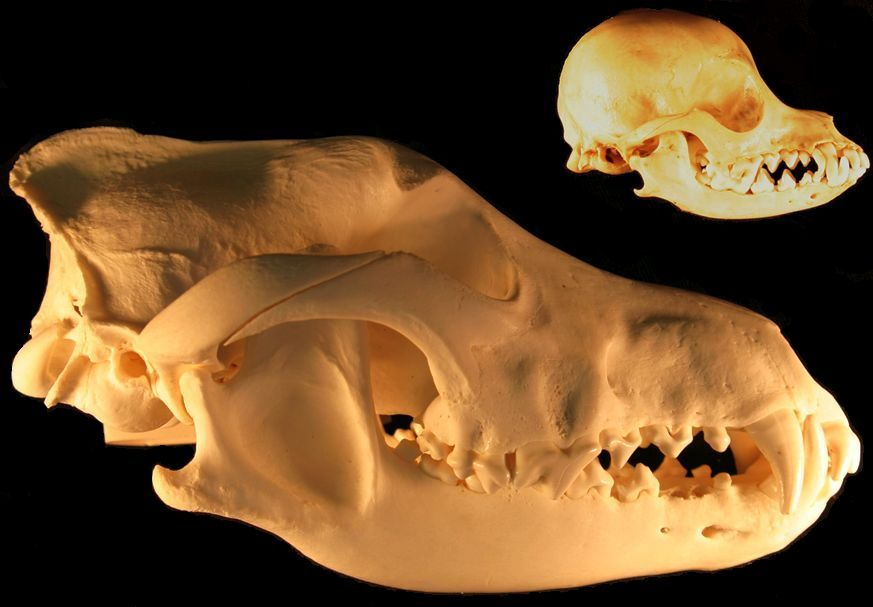
Reduction in skull size with neoteny - grey wolf and chihuahua skulls

The sustained selection for lowered reactivity among mammal domesticates has resulted in profound changes in brain form and function. The larger the size of the brain to begin with and the greater its degree of folding, the greater the degree of brain-size reduction under domestication. Foxes that had been selectively bred for tameness over 40 years had experienced a significant reduction in cranial height and width and by inference in brain size, which supports the hypothesis that brain-size reduction is an early response to the selective pressure for tameness and lowered reactivity that is the universal feature of animal domestication. The most affected portion of the brain in domestic mammals is the limbic system, which in domestic dogs, pigs, and sheep show a 40% reduction in size compared with their wild species. This portion of the brain regulates endocrine function that influences behaviors such as aggression, wariness, and responses to environmentally induced stress, all attributes which are dramatically affected by domestication.

=== Pleiotropy ===
A putative cause for the broad changes seen in domestication syndrome is pleiotropy. Pleiotropy occurs when one gene influences two or more seemingly unrelated phenotypic traits. Certain physiological changes characterize domestic animals of many species. These changes include extensive white markings (particularly on the head), floppy ears, and curly tails. These arise even when tameness is the only trait under selective pressure. The genes involved in tameness are largely unknown, so it is not known how or to what extent pleiotropy contributes to domestication syndrome. Tameness may be caused by the downregulation of fear and stress responses via reduction of the adrenal glands. Based on this, the pleiotropy hypotheses can be separated into two theories. The Neural Crest Hypothesis relates adrenal gland function to deficits in neural crest cells during development. The Single Genetic Regulatory Network Hypothesis claims that genetic changes in upstream regulators affect downstream systems.

Neural crest cells (NCC) are vertebrate embryonic stem cells that function directly and indirectly during early embryogenesis to produce many tissue types. Because the traits commonly affected by domestication syndrome are all derived from NCC in development, the neural crest hypothesis suggests that deficits in these cells cause the domain of phenotypes seen in domestication syndrome. These deficits could cause changes we see to many domestic mammals, such as lopped ears (seen in rabbit, dog, fox, pig, sheep, goat, cattle, and donkeys) as well as curly tails (pigs, foxes, and dogs). Although they do not affect the development of the adrenal cortex directly, the neural crest cells may be involved in relevant upstream embryological interactions. Furthermore, artificial selection targeting tameness may affect genes that control the concentration or movement of NCCs in the embryo, leading to a variety of phenotypes.

The single genetic regulatory network hypothesis proposes that domestication syndrome results from mutations in genes that regulate the expression pattern of more downstream genes. For example piebald, or spotted coat coloration, may be caused by a linkage in the biochemical pathways of melanins involved in coat coloration and neurotransmitters such as dopamine that help shape behavior and cognition. These linked traits may arise from mutations in a few key regulatory genes. A problem with this hypothesis is that it proposes that there are mutations in gene networks that cause dramatic effects that are not lethal, however no currently known genetic regulatory networks cause such dramatic change in so many different traits.

=== Limited reversion ===
Feral mammals such as dogs, cats, goats, donkeys, pigs, and ferrets that have lived apart from humans for generations show no sign of regaining the brain mass of their wild progenitors. Dingos have lived apart from humans for thousands of years but still have the same brain size as that of a domestic dog. Feral dogs that actively avoid human contact are still dependent on human waste for survival and have not reverted to the self-sustaining behaviors of their wolf ancestors.

== Categories ==
Domestication can be considered the final phase of intensification in the relationship between animal or plant sub-populations and human societies, but it is divided into several grades of intensification. For studies in animal domestication, researchers have proposed five distinct categories: wild, captive wild, domestic, cross-breeds and feral.

Wild animals
Subject to natural selection, although the action of past demographic events and artificial selection induced by game management or habitat destruction cannot be excluded.
Captive wild animals
Directly affected by a relaxation of natural selection associated with feeding, breeding and protection/confinement by humans, and an intensification of artificial selection through passive selection for animals that are more suited to captivity.
Domestic animals
Subject to intensified artificial selection through husbandry practices with relaxation of natural selection associated with captivity and management.
Cross-breed animals
Genetic hybrids of wild and domestic parents. They may be forms intermediate between both parents, forms more similar to one parent than the other, or unique forms distinct from both parents. Hybrids can be intentionally bred for specific characteristics or can arise unintentionally as the result of contact with wild individuals.
Feral animals
Domesticates that have returned to a wild state. As such, they experience relaxed artificial selection induced by the captive environment paired with intensified natural selection induced by the wild habitat.

In 2015, a study compared the diversity of dental size, shape and allometry across the proposed domestication categories of modern pigs (genus Sus). The study showed clear differences between the dental phenotypes of wild, captive wild, domestic, and hybrid pig populations, which supported the proposed categories through physical evidence. The study did not cover feral pig populations but called for further research to be undertaken on them, and on the genetic differences with hybrid pigs.

== Pathways ==
Since 2012, a multi-stage model of animal domestication has been accepted by two groups. The first group proposed that animal domestication proceeded along a continuum of stages from anthropophily, commensalism, control in the wild, control of captive animals, extensive breeding, intensive breeding, and finally to pets in a slow, gradually intensifying relationship between humans and animals.

The second group proposed that there were three major pathways that most animal domesticates followed into domestication: (1) commensals, adapted to a human niche (e.g., dogs, cats, fowl, possibly pigs); (2) prey animals sought for food (e.g., sheep, goats, cattle, water buffalo, yak, pig, reindeer, llama and alpaca); and (3) targeted animals for draft and nonfood resources (e.g., horse, donkey, camel). The beginnings of animal domestication involved a protracted coevolutionary process with multiple stages along different pathways. Humans did not intend to domesticate animals from, or at least they did not envision a domesticated animal resulting from, either the commensal or prey pathways. In both of these cases, humans became entangled with these species as the relationship between them, and the human role in their survival and reproduction, intensified. Although the directed pathway proceeded from capture to taming, the other two pathways are not as goal-oriented and archaeological records suggest that they take place over much longer time frames.

The pathways that animals may have followed are not mutually exclusive. Pigs, for example, may have been domesticated as their populations became accustomed to the human niche, which would suggest a commensal pathway, or they may have been hunted and followed a prey pathway, or both.

=== Commensal ===
The commensal pathway was traveled by vertebrates that fed on refuse around human habitats or by animals that preyed on other animals drawn to human camps. Those animals established a commensal relationship with humans in which the animals benefited but the humans received no harm but little benefit. Those animals that were most capable of taking advantage of the resources associated with human camps would have been the tamer, less aggressive individuals with shorter fight or flight distances. Later, these animals developed closer social or economic bonds with humans that led to a domestic relationship. The leap from a synanthropic population to a domestic one could only have taken place after the animals had progressed from anthropophily to habituation, to commensalism and partnership, when the relationship between animal and human would have laid the foundation for domestication, including captivity and human-controlled breeding. From this perspective, animal domestication is a coevolutionary process in which a population responds to selective pressure while adapting to a novel niche that included another species with evolving behaviors. Commensal pathway animals include dogs, cats, fowl, and possibly pigs.

The domestication of animals commenced over 15,000 years before present (YBP), beginning with the grey wolf (Canis lupus) by nomadic hunter-gatherers. It was not until 11,000 YBP that people living in the Near East entered into relationships with wild populations of aurochs, boar, sheep, and goats. A domestication process then began to develop. The grey wolf most likely followed the commensal pathway to domestication. When, where, and how many times wolves may have been domesticated remains debated because only a small number of ancient specimens have been found, and both archaeology and genetics continue to provide conflicting evidence. The most widely accepted, earliest dog remains date back 15,000 YBP to the Bonn–Oberkassel dog. Earlier remains dating back to 30,000 YBP have been described as Paleolithic dogs, however their status as dogs or wolves remains debated. Recent studies indicate that a genetic divergence occurred between dogs and wolves 20,000–40,000 YBP, however this is the upper time-limit for domestication because it represents the time of divergence and not the time of domestication.

The chicken is one of the most widespread domesticated species and one of the human world's largest sources of protein. Although the chicken was domesticated in South-East Asia, archaeological evidence suggests that it was not kept as a livestock species until 400 BCE in the Levant. Prior to this, chickens had been associated with humans for thousands of years and kept for cock-fighting, rituals, and royal zoos, so they were not originally a prey species. The chicken was not a popular food in Europe until only one thousand years ago.

=== Prey ===
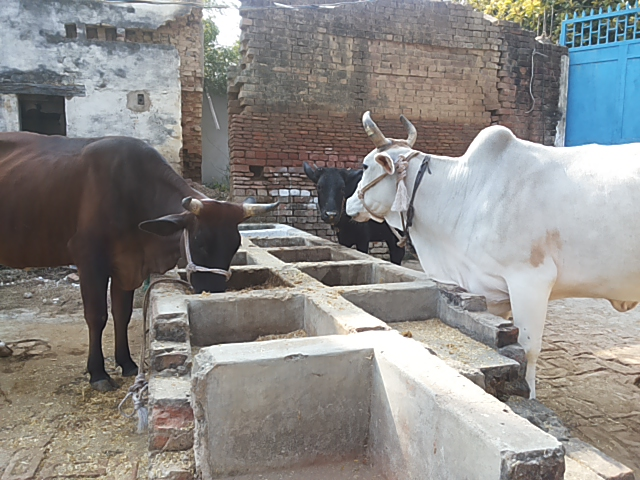
Humped cattle serving as dairy cows in India

The prey pathway was the way in which most major livestock species entered into domestication as these were once hunted by humans for their meat. Domestication was likely initiated when humans began to experiment with hunting strategies designed to increase the availability of these prey, perhaps as a response to localized pressure on the supply of the animal. Over time and with the more responsive species, these game-management strategies developed into herd-management strategies that included the sustained multi-generational control over the animals' movement, feeding, and reproduction. As human interference in the life-cycles of prey animals intensified, the evolutionary pressures for a lack of aggression would have led to an acquisition of the same domestication syndrome traits found in the commensal domesticates.

Prey pathway animals include sheep, goats, cattle, water buffalo, yak, pig, reindeer, llama and alpaca. The right conditions for the domestication for some of them appear to have been in place in the central and eastern Fertile Crescent at the end of the Younger Dryas climatic downturn and the beginning of the Early Holocene about 11,700 YBP, and by 10,000 YBP people were preferentially killing young males of a variety of species and allowed the females to live in order to produce more offspring. By measuring the size, sex ratios, and mortality profiles of zooarchaeological specimens, archeologists have been able to document changes in the management strategies of hunted sheep, goats, pigs, and cows in the Fertile Crescent starting 11,700 YBP. A recent demographic and metrical study of cow and pig remains at Sha'ar Hagolan, Israel, demonstrated that both species were severely overhunted before domestication, suggesting that the intensive exploitation led to management strategies adopted throughout the region that ultimately led to the domestication of these populations following the prey pathway. This pattern of overhunting before domestication suggests that the prey pathway was as accidental and unintentional as the commensal pathway.

=== Directed ===
Kazakh shepherd with horse and dogs. Their job is to guard the sheep from predators.

The directed pathway was a more deliberate and directed process initiated by humans with the goal of domesticating a free-living animal. It probably only came into being once people were familiar with either commensal or prey-pathway domesticated animals. These animals were likely not to possess many of the behavioral preadaptions some species show before domestication. Therefore, the domestication of these animals requires more deliberate effort by humans to work around behaviors that do not assist domestication, with increased technological assistance needed.

Humans were already reliant on domestic plants and animals when they imagined the domestic versions of wild animals. Although horses, donkeys, and Old World camels were sometimes hunted as prey species, they were each deliberately brought into the human niche for sources of transport. Domestication was still a multi-generational adaptation to human selection pressures, including tameness, but without a suitable evolutionary response then domestication was not achieved. For example, despite the fact that hunters of the Near Eastern gazelle in the Epipaleolithic avoided culling reproductive females to promote population balance, neither gazelles nor zebras possessed the necessary prerequisites and were never domesticated. There is no clear evidence for the domestication of any herded prey animal in Africa, with the notable exception of the donkey, which was domesticated in Northeast Africa sometime in the 4th millennium BCE.

== Post-domestication gene flow ==
As agricultural societies migrated away from the domestication centers taking their domestic partners with them, they encountered populations of wild animals of the same or sister species. Because domestics often shared a recent common ancestor with the wild populations, they were capable of producing fertile offspring. Domestic populations were small relative to the surrounding wild populations, and repeated hybridizations between the two eventually led to the domestic population becoming more genetically divergent from its original domestic source population.

Advances in DNA sequencing technology allow the nuclear genome to be accessed and analyzed in a population genetics framework. The increased resolution of nuclear sequences has demonstrated that gene flow is common, not only between geographically diverse domestic populations of the same species but also between domestic populations and wild species that never gave rise to a domestic population.

- The yellow leg trait possessed by numerous modern commercial chicken breeds was acquired via introgression from the grey junglefowl indigenous to South Asia.
- African cattle are hybrids that possess both a European Taurine cattle maternal mitochondrial signal and an Asian Indicine cattle paternal Y-chromosome signature.
- Numerous other bovid species, including bison, yak, banteng, and gaur hybridize with ease.
- Cats and horses have been shown to hybridize with many closely related species.

The archaeological and genetic data suggests that long-term bidirectional gene flow between wild and domestic stocks – including canids, donkeys, horses, New and Old World camelids, goats, sheep, and pigs – was common. Bidirectional gene flow between domestic and wild reindeer continues today.

The consequence of this introgression is that modern domestic populations can often appear to have much greater genomic affinity to wild populations that were never involved in the original domestication process. Therefore, it is proposed that the term "domestication" should be reserved solely for the initial process of domestication of a discrete population in time and space. Subsequent admixture between introduced domestic populations and local wild populations that were never domesticated should be referred to as "introgressive capture". Conflating these two processes muddles understanding of the original process and can lead to an artificial inflation of the number of times domestication took place. This introgression can, in some cases, be regarded as adaptive introgression, as observed in domestic sheep due to gene flow with the wild European Mouflon.

The sustained admixture between dog and wolf populations across the Old and New Worlds over at least the last 10,000 years has blurred the genetic signatures and confounded efforts of researchers at pinpointing the origins of domestic dogs. None of the modern wolf populations are related to the Pleistocene wolves that were first domesticated, and the extinction of the wolves that were the direct ancestors of dogs has muddied efforts to pinpoint the time and place of dog domestication.

== Positive selection ==
Charles Darwin recognized the small number of traits that made domestic species different from their wild ancestors. He was also the first to recognize the difference between conscious selective breeding in which humans directly select for desirable traits, and unconscious selection where traits evolve as a by-product of natural selection or from selection on other traits.

Domestic animals vary in coat color, craniofacial morphology, reduced brain size, floppy ears, and changes in the endocrine system and reproductive cycle. The domesticated silver fox experiment demonstrated that selection for tameness within a few generations can result in modified behavioral, morphological, and physiological traits. The experiment demonstrated that domestic phenotypic traits could arise through selection for a behavioral trait, and that domestic behavioral traits could arise through the selection for a phenotypic trait. In addition, the experiment provided a mechanism for the start of the animal domestication process that did not depend on deliberate human forethought and action. In the 1980s, a researcher used a set of behavioral, cognitive, and visible phenotypic markers, such as coat color, to produce domesticated fallow deer within a few generations. Similar results for tameness and fear have been found for mink and Japanese quail.

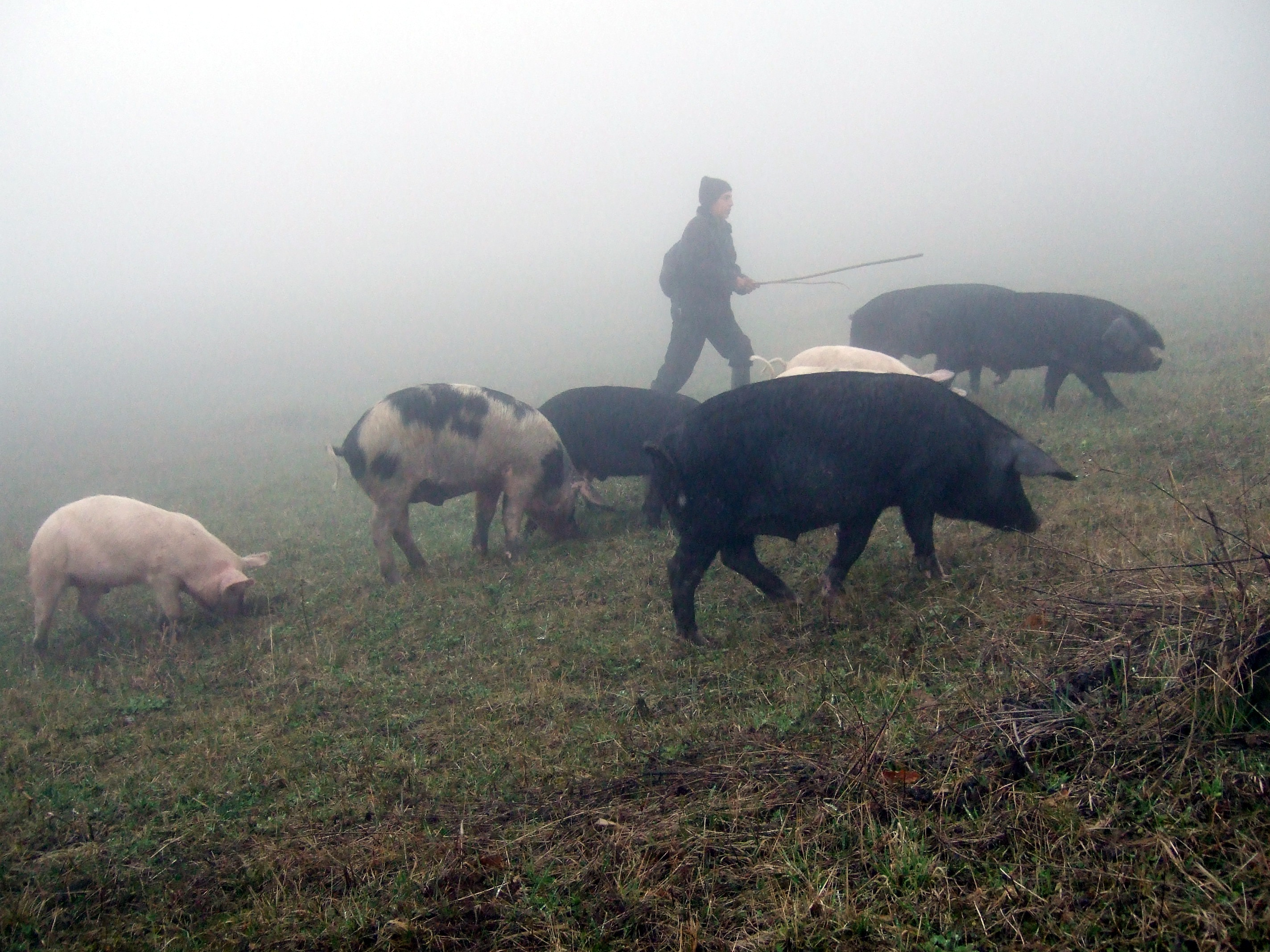
Pig herding in fog, Armenia. Human selection for domestic traits is not affected by later gene flow from wild boar.

The genetic difference between domestic and wild populations can be framed within two considerations. The first distinguishes between domestication traits that are presumed to have been essential at the early stages of domestication, and improvement traits that have appeared since the split between wild and domestic populations. Domestication traits are generally fixed within all domesticates and were selected during the initial episode of domestication, whereas improvement traits are present only in a proportion of domesticates, though they may be fixed in individual breeds or regional populations. A second issue is whether traits associated with the domestication syndrome resulted from a relaxation of selection as animals exited the wild environment or from positive selection resulting from intentional and unintentional human preference. Some recent genomic studies on the genetic basis of traits associated with the domestication syndrome have shed light on both of these issues.

Geneticists have identified more than 300 genetic loci and 150 genes associated with coat color variability. Knowing the mutations associated with different colors has allowed some correlation between the timing of the appearance of variable coat colors in horses with the timing of their domestication. Other studies have shown how human-induced selection is responsible for the allelic variation in pigs. Together, these insights suggest that, although natural selection has kept variation to a minimum before domestication, humans have actively selected for novel coat colors as soon as they appeared in managed populations.

In 2015, a study looked at over 100 pig genome sequences to ascertain their process of domestication. The process of domestication was assumed to have been initiated by humans, involved few individuals and relied on reproductive isolation between wild and domestic forms, but the study found that the assumption of reproductive isolation with population bottlenecks was not supported. The study indicated that pigs were domesticated separately in Western Asia and China, with Western Asian pigs introduced into Europe where they crossed with wild boar. A model that fitted the data included admixture with a now extinct ghost population of wild pigs during the Pleistocene. The study also found that despite back-crossing with wild pigs, the genomes of domestic pigs have strong signatures of selection at genetic loci that affect behavior and morphology. Human selection for domestic traits likely counteracted the homogenizing effect of gene flow from wild boars and created domestication islands in the genome.

Unlike other domestic species which were primarily selected for production-related traits, dogs were initially selected for their behaviors. In 2016, a study found that there were only 11 fixed genes that showed variation between wolves and dogs. These gene variations were unlikely to have been the result of natural evolution, and indicate selection on both morphology and behavior during dog domestication. These genes have been shown to affect the catecholamine synthesis pathway, with the majority of the genes affecting the fight-or-flight response (i.e. selection for tameness), and emotional processing. Dogs generally show reduced fear and aggression compared to wolves. Some of these genes have been associated with aggression in some dog breeds, indicating their importance in both the initial domestication and then later in breed formation.

== See also ==
- List of domesticated animals
- Hybrid (biology)#Examples of hybrid animals and animal populations derived from hybrid
- Landrace
