= SD =

SD may refer to:

== Military and weaponry ==
- Smith & Wesson SD, a line of pistol (first made 2010)
- SD radar, an early US Navy radar system
- Southern Cross Decoration (SD), a South African military award

== Organisations ==
=== Political parties ===
- Democratic Left (Italy) (2007–2010; Italian: Sinistra Democratica)
- Social Democrats (Slovenia) (founded 1993)
- Solidarity (Brazil) (founded 2012)
- Democratic Party (Poland) (founded 1937; Polish: Stronnictwo Demokratyczne)
- Sweden Democrats (founded 1988)
- Swiss Democrats, Switzerland (renamed 1990; German: Schweizer Demokraten)
- Serbian Right (founded 2018; Serbian: Srpska desnica)

=== Other organisations ===
- Sicherheitsdienst, Nazi intelligence service (1931–1945)
- Sisters of the Destitute, a Syro-Malabar Catholic order (founded 1927)
- Sudan Airways (founded 1946; IATA:SD)

== Places ==
- Sudan (ISO 3166 country code:SD)
- A common abbreviation for the U.S. city of San Diego, California and the San Diego Padres—the city's Major League Baseball team
- Shandong, a province of China
- South Dakota, a US state
- Eswatini (formerly Swaziland; SD on vehicle plates)

== Science and technology ==
=== Astronomy ===
- Subdwarf, a class of star
- Surface detector, of cosmic rays at the Pierre Auger Observatory

=== Electronics and computing ===
- SD card (Secure Digital), a flash memory card format
- Standard-definition television
- Super Density Disc, an optical disc format
- Stable Diffusion, a text-to-image generator

=== Mathematics ===
- sd (elliptic function), one of Jacobi's elliptic functions
- Standard deviation (SD), a statistical measure of variation

=== Medicine ===
- Spasmodic dysphonia, a voice disorder
- Stable disease, a RECIST chemotherapy outcome

=== Other uses in science and technology ===
- Segregation distorter, a selfish genetic element which biases its own genetic transmission
- Service design, holistic design of service experience
- Spiral Dynamics, a model of individual and societal development
- Storm Data, a US meteorological journal
- System dynamics, of nonlinear systems

== Other uses ==
- Sekolah Dasar, term for primary school in Indonesia
- Sindhi language (ISO 639-1 code: sd)
- sine die, Latin, undated (literally without a day)
- Split decision, in full-contact combat sports
- Super D (cycling), a class of mountain bike race
- Super deformed, an art style

== See also ==
- SD1 (disambiguation)
