= Raymond Coppinger =

American academic

- Born: February 8, 1937
- Died: August 14, 2017
- Education: Bachelors at Boston University Ph.D. at University of Massachusetts, Amherst
- Employer: Hampshire College
- Known for: Canine origin research
- Spouse: Lorna Coppinger

Raymond Coppinger (8 February 1937 – August 14, 2017) was a professor of cognitive science and biology at Hampshire College. He was an expert in dog behavior and the origin of the domestic dog.

== Education ==
He majored in literature and philosophy at Boston University. He received his Ph.D. at the University of Massachusetts in biology. His thesis was on "the effect of experience and novelty on avian feeding behavior."

== Career ==
He was one of the first faculty members at Hampshire College when it was founded in 1969.

He published more than 60 scientific articles, and appeared in many documentaries including for the BBC, the Canadian Broadcasting Company, and PBS.

His wife Lorna Coppinger was a frequent collaborator on research and writing. In their book "What Is a Dog?," they argue that vast majority of street dogs are not strays or lost pets, but rather well-adapted scavengers, similar to the dogs that first emerged thousands of years ago.

=== Livestock Dog Project ===
The Coppingers compiled data for ten years from over 1,400 Livestock Guardian Dogs (LGDs) to research their use on American ranches to combat coyotes. Their work is still the single largest, long term study of LGDs. He and his wife helped develop and popularize the Anatolian Shepherd breed in the United States.

=== Foxes ===
His research on foxes has challenged views about domestication syndrome with foxes, suggesting that the traits associated with the syndrome occurred in the fox population prior to their domestication.

== Death ==
Coppinger died at the age of 80, from cancer. He is survived by his wife, Lorna.

== Books ==
- Coppinger, Raymond; Coppinger, Lorna (2016). What Is a Dog?. University of Chicago Press. ISBN 9780226478227.
- Coppinger, Raymond; Feinstein, Mark (2015). How Dogs Work. University of Chicago Press. ISBN 9780226128139.
- Coppinger, Raymond (2014). Fishing Dogs: A Guide to the History, Talents, and Training of the Baildale, the Flounderhounder, the Angler Dog, and Sundry Other Breeds of Aquatic Dogs (Canis piscatorius). Simon and Schuster. ISBN 9781628739381.
- Coppinger, Raymond; Coppinger, Lorna (2001). Dogs: A Startling New Understanding of Canine Origin, Behavior, and Evolution. Scribner. ISBN 9780684855301.
- Coppinger, Raymond (1978). Livestock guarding dogs for U.S. agriculture.
