= SD1 =

SD1 or SD-1 may refer to:

- South Dakota's 1st congressional district, a United States electoral district
- British NVC community SD1, the only shingle community in the British National Vegetation Classification system
- MSD SD-1, a floppy disk drive station for Commodore computers
- Panasonic HDC-SD1, a digital camcorder
- Sigma SD1, a digital SLR camera
- Rover SD1, a British car built between 1976 and 1986
- Spacek SD-1 Minisport, a Czech amateur-built aircraft design
- Northrop SD-1 drone, a battlefield reconnaissance drone of the 1960s
- SD1 (gene), a gene that may be part of the agricultural weed syndrome of Oryza sativa and O. rufipogon weeds
- The Ensoniq SD-1, a synthesizer in Ensoniq's VFX line of synthesizers
