= Domestication syndrome =

Proposed biological phenomenon

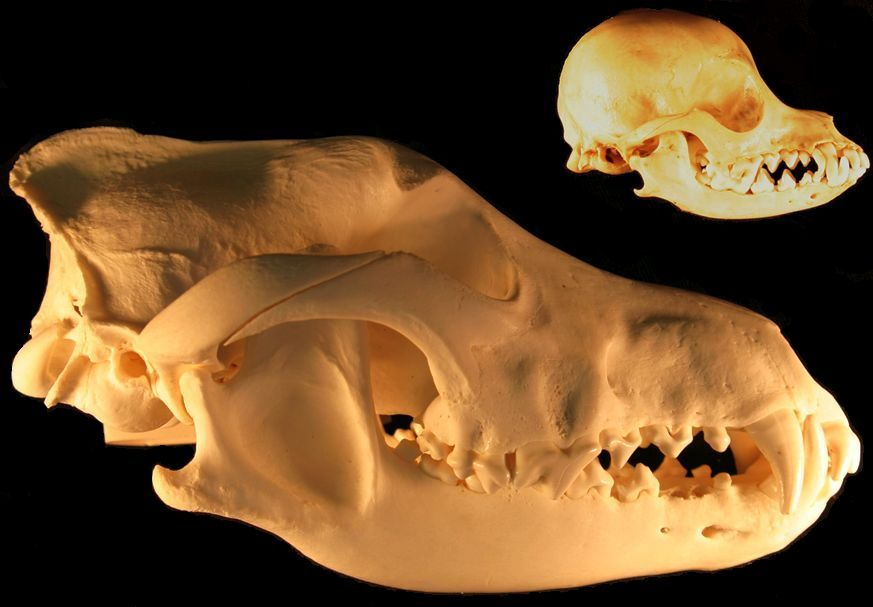
Reduction in size is regarded as a domestication syndrome trait - grey wolf skull compared with a chihuahua skull

Domestication syndrome refers to two sets of phenotypic traits that are common to either domesticated plants or domesticated animals.

Domesticated animals tend to be smaller and less aggressive than their wild counterparts; they may also have floppy ears, variations to coat color, a smaller brain, and a shorter muzzle. Other traits may include changes in the endocrine system and an extended breeding cycle. These animal traits have been claimed to emerge across the different species in response to selection for tameness, which was purportedly demonstrated in a famous Russian fox breeding experiment, though this claim has been disputed.

Other research suggested that pleiotropic change in neural crest cell regulating genes was the common cause of shared traits seen in many domesticated animal species. However, several recent publications have either questioned this neural crest cell explanation or cast doubt on the existence of domestication syndrome itself. One recent publication points out that shared selective regime changes following transition from wild to domestic environments are a more likely cause of any convergent traits. In addition, the sheer number, diversity, and phenotypic importance of neural crest cell-derived vertebrate features means that changes in genes associated with them are almost inevitable in response to any significant selective change.

A significant aspect of domestication syndrome is prolonged juvenile behavior/traits. A universal problem with the keeping of tame wild animals is the eventual, inevitable adulthood and behavioral difficulties thereof. Toy/teacup breed animals may be considered the furthest extreme aspect of this, as they are essentially juveniles their entire lives (to the point where breeding them is a complex, delicate matter, and survival of the infants is lowered).

The process of plant domestication has produced changes in shattering/fruit abscission, shorter height, larger grain or fruit size, easier threshing, synchronous flowering, and increased yield, as well as changes in color, taste, and texture. However, by making these plant traits more favorable as food for humans, these plants quite often are also more favorable to herbivores by virtue of changing plant defensive traits and increasing organ size and nutrition, and is overall a human-mediated change on plant-insect interactions that extends to multiple trophic levels.

== Origin ==
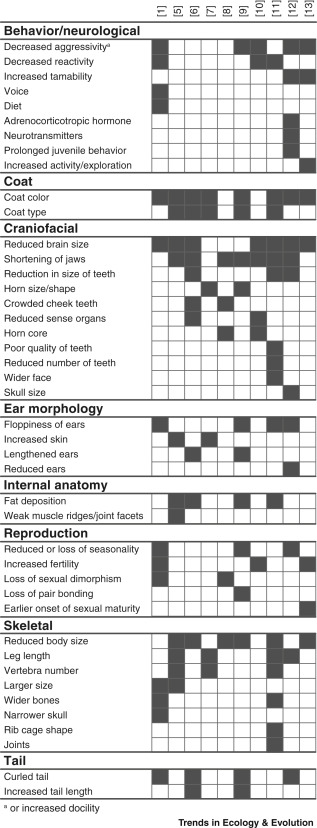
In ten publications on domestication syndrome in animals, no single trait is included in every one.

Charles Darwin's study of The Variation of Animals and Plants Under Domestication in 1868 identified various behavioral, morphological, and physiological traits that are shared by domestic animals, but not by their wild ancestors. These shared traits became known as "the domestication syndrome", a term originally used to describe common changes in domesticated grains. In animals, these traits include tameness, docility, floppy ears, altered tails, novel coat colors and patterns, reduced brain size, reduced body mass and smaller teeth. Other traits include changes in craniofacial morphology, alterations to the endocrine system, and changes to the female estrous cycles including the ability to breed all year-round.

A recent hypothesis suggests that neural crest cell behaviour may be modified by domestication, which then leads to those traits that are common across many domesticated animal species. This hypothesis has claimed support from many gene-based studies; e.g., However, recent publications have disputed this support; pointing out that observed change in neural crest related genes only reveals change in neural crest-derived features. In effect, it is not evidence of linked trait changes in different species due to pleiotropic neural crest mechanisms as claimed by the neural crest cell hypothesis. For example, all of the craniofacial skeleton is derived from the neural crest, so any animal population that experiences evolutionary change in craniofacial features will show changes in genes associated with the neural crest. The number and importance of neural crest cell features in all vertebrates means change in these features is almost inevitable under the major selective regime shifts experienced by animals making the wild to domestic transition.

== Cause ==
Many similar traits – both in animals and plants – are produced by orthologs; however, whether this is true for domestication traits or merely for wild forms is less clear. Especially in the case of plant crops, doubt has been cast because some domestication traits have been found to result from unrelated loci.

In 2018, a study identified 429 genes that differed between modern dogs and modern wolves. As the differences in these genes could also be found in ancient dog fossils, these were regarded as being the result of the initial domestication and not from recent breed formation. These genes are linked to neural crest and central nervous system development. These genes affect embryogenesis and can confer tameness, smaller jaws, floppy ears, and diminished craniofacial development, which distinguish domesticated dogs from wolves and are considered to reflect domestication syndrome. The study concluded that during early dog domestication, the initial selection was for behavior. This trait is influenced by those genes which act in the neural crest, which led to the phenotypes observed in modern dogs.

The 2023 parasite-mediated domestication hypothesis suggests that endoparasites such as helminths and protozoa could have mediated the domestication of mammals. Domestication involves taming, which has an endocrine component; and parasites can modify endocrine activity and microRNAs. Genes for resistance to parasites might be linked to those for the domestication syndrome; it is predicted that domestic animals are less resistant to parasites than their wild relatives.

== In animals ==
A dog's cranium is 15% smaller than an equally heavy wolf's, and the dog is less aggressive and more playful. Other species pairs show similar differences. Bonobos, like chimpanzees, are a close genetic cousin to humans, but unlike the chimpanzees, bonobos are not aggressive and do not participate in lethal inter-group aggression or kill within their own group. The most distinctive features of a bonobo are its cranium, which is 15% smaller than a chimpanzee's, and its less aggressive and more playful behavior. These and other features led to the proposal that bonobos are a 'self-domesticated' ape. In other examples, the guinea pig's cranium is 13% smaller than its wild cousin the cavy, and domestic fowl show a similar reduction to their wild cousins. In a famous Russian farm fox experiment, foxes selectively bred for reduced aggression appeared to show other traits associated with domestication syndrome. This prompted the claim that domestication syndrome was caused by selection for tameness. The foxes were not selectively bred for smaller craniums and teeth, floppy ears, or skills at using human gestures, but these traits were demonstrated in the friendly foxes. Natural selection favors those that are the most successful at reproducing, not the most aggressive. Selection against aggression made possible the ability to cooperate and communicate among foxes, dogs and bonobos. The more docile animals have been found to have less testosterone than their more aggressive counterparts, and testosterone controls aggression and brain size. The further away a dog breed is genetically from wolves, the larger the relative brain size is.

=== Challenge ===
The domestication syndrome was reported to have appeared in the domesticated silver fox cultivated by Dmitry Belyayev's breeding experiment. However, in 2015 canine researcher Raymond Coppinger found historical evidence that Belyayev's foxes originated in fox farms on Prince Edward Island and had been bred there for fur farming since the 1800s, and that the traits demonstrated by Belyayev had occurred in the foxes prior to the breeding experiment. A 2019 opinion paper by Lord and colleagues argued that the results of the "Russian farm fox experiment" were overstated, although the pre-domesticated origins of these Russian foxes were already a matter of scientific record.

In 2020, Wright et al. argued Lord et al.'s critique refuted only a narrow and unrealistic definition of domestication syndrome because their criteria assumed it must be caused by genetic pleiotropy, and arises in response to 'selection for tameness'--as was claimed by Belyaev, Trut, and the proposers of the neural crest hypothesis. In the same year, Zeder pointed out that it makes no sense to deny the existence of domestication syndrome on the basis that domestication syndrome traits were present in the pre-domesticated founding foxes.

The hypothesis that neural crest genes underlie some of the phenotypic differences between domestic and wild horses and dogs is supported by the functional enrichment of candidate genes under selection. But, the observation of changed neural crest cell genes between wild and domestic populations need only reveal changes to features derived from neural crest, it does not support the claim of a common underlying genetic architecture that causes all of the domestication syndrome traits in all of the different animal species.

Gleeson and Wilson synthesised this debate and showed that animal domestication syndrome is not caused by selection for tameness, or by neural crest cell genetic pleiotropy. However, it could result from shared selective regime changes (which they termed 'reproductive disruption') leading to similarly shared trait changes across different species--in effect, a series of partial trait convergences. They proposed four primary selective pathways that are commonly altered by the shift to a domestic selective context, and would often lead to similar shifts in different populations. These pathways are:

1. Disrupted inter-sexual selection in males (reduced/altered female choice).
2. Disrupted intra-sexual selection in males (reduced/altered male-male competition).
3. Changed resource availability and predation pressure affecting female fertility and offspring survival.
4. Intensified potential for maternal stress, selecting for altered reproductive physiology in females.

Because the 'Reproductive Disruption' hypothesis explains domestication syndrome as a result of changed selective regimes, it can encompass multiple genetic or physiological ways that similar traits might emerge in the different domesticated species. For example, tamer behaviour might be caused by reduced adrenal reactivity, by increased oxytocin production, or by a combination of these or other mechanisms, across the different populations and species.

== In plants ==
=== Syndrome traits ===
The same concept appears in the plant domestication process which produces crops, but with its own set of syndrome traits. In cereals, these include little to no shattering/fruit abscission, shorter height (thus decreased lodging), larger grain or fruit size, easier threshing, synchronous flowering, altered timing of flowering, increased grain weight, glutinousness (stickiness, not gluten protein content), increased fruit/grain number, altered color compounds, taste, and texture, daylength independence, determinate growth, lesser/no vernalization, less seed dormancy.

There also tends to be an overall reduction in plant resistance to herbivores, which can take the form of reduced secondary metabolites or physical feeding barriers. This often ends up being beneficial to herbivores. Additionally, plant domestication can go on to affect the third trophic level. For example, plant domestication can lead to reduced defenses and higher nutrition in the plant, which in turn benefits the herbivore. On one hand, there can be the trade-offs hypothesis, wherein the healthier herbivore is now also providing a bigger and more nutritious prey for its natural enemy, such as a predator or parasitoid. Alternatively, there can also be the host immunity hypothesis, in which the healthier herbivore now can have a stronger immune or response system, thus acting to the detriment of the natural enemy.

=== Cereal genes by trait ===
Control of the syndrome traits in cereals is by:

Shattering

- SH1 in sorghum, rice, and maize/corn
- sh4 in the rachis of rice
- qPDH1 in soybean
- Q in wheat
- LG1 in rice

Plant height

- Rht-B1/Rht-D1 (two orthologous versions of Rht-1 on different subgenomes, Rht standing for reduced height) in wheat
- GA20ox-2 in rice and barley
- KO2 in one Japanese cultivar of rice
- either dw3 or d2 in sorghum and pearl millet
- Ghd7 in rice
- Q in wheat

Grain size

- GS3 in maize/corn and rice
- GS5 in rice
- An-1 in rice
- GAD1/RAE2 (smaller) in rice

Yield

- SPL14/LOC4345998 in rice.
- pyl1, pyl4, pyl6 in the PYL gene family in rice

Threshability

- Q and Nud
- An-1 (by reducing or eliminating awns) in rice
- An-2/LABA1 - small awn reduction/barbless awns - in rice
- GAD1/RAE2 - awn elimination in rice
- tga1 - naked kernels in maize

Flowering time

- VRN1 in barley, wheat, ryegrass

Grain weight

- GW2 in rice, wheat, maize/corn
- GW5 in rice
- GLW2 in rice
- GASR7 in wheat
- GW5 in rice
- TGW6 in rice

Glutinousness

- GBSSI or Waxy in rice (especially glutinous rice), wheat, corn, barley, sorghum, foxtail millet
- SBEIIb in rice

Determinate growth

- TERMINAL FLOWER 1/TFL1 in Arabidopsis thaliana and orthologs
  - Specifically, four orthologs in Glycine max and eight in Phaseolus vulgaris

Standability

- PROSTRATE GROWTH/Prog1/PROG1 in rice
- teosinte branched1/tb1 (apical dominance) in maize/corn

Grain/fruit number

- An-1 in rice
- GAD1/RAE2 in rice
- PROG1 (by increasing tiller number) in rice
- Gn1a in rice
- AAP3 (by increasing tiller number) in rice

Panicle size

- DEP1 in rice and wheat

Spike number

- vrs1 in barley

Fragrance

- BADH2 produces 2-Acetyl-1-pyrroline when defective in rice; can be artificially disrupted to produce the same compound

Delayed sprouting

- pyl1, pyl4, pyl6 in the PYL gene family - reduced preharvest sprouting in rice

Altered color

- Rc - white pericarp in rice

Unspecified trait

- Teosinte glume architecture/tga in maize/corn

Many of these are mutations in regulatory genes, especially transcription factors, which is likely why they work so well in domestication: They are not new, and are relatively ready to have their magnitudes altered. In annual grains, loss of function and altered expression are by far the most common, and thus are the most interesting goals of mutation breeding, while copy number variation and chromosomal rearrangements are far less common.

== See also ==
- Agricultural weed syndrome
