= Weedy rice =

Variety of rice, considered a pest

Weedy rice, also known as red rice, is a variety of rice (Oryza) that produces far fewer grains per plant than cultivated rice and is therefore considered a pest. The name "weedy rice" is used for all types and variations of rice which show some characteristic features of cultivated rice and grow as weeds in commercial rice fields. Populations of weedy rice are found in many rice-growing regions. Weedy rice varieties generally have fragile stalks that self-seed before harvest. Variations of weedy rice adapt to a wide range of natural conditions.

Weedy rice grains often have a red pericarp, so for this reason in the international literature the term "red rice" is often used. This term, however, is not all too fitting, because red pericarp is also found in some cultivated varieties, and is absent in many forms of weedy rice.

In most regions of rice production, weedy rice is introduced after the transition from transplanting rice to sowing commercial seeds directly in the rice field. It has become very significant since the mid-1980s, especially in Europe, with the weak semi-dwarf varieties of indica subspecies. Weedy rice can be found in 40–75% of rice fields in Europe, 40% of fields in Brazil, 55% in Senegal, 80% in Cuba, and 60% in Costa Rica.

Because weedy rice and cultivated rice are so closely related, herbicides that would kill red rice would also kill cultivated rice. A genetically modified form of cultivated rice has been developed that will resist a herbicide, but this form of rice has not been approved for human consumption. This genetically modified form of cultivated rice has, however, appeared on the rice market.

One way sometimes used for combating weedy rice is to plant a red rice one year and, on that land, a green rice next year, and so alternating, and in each crop to pull up any rice plants that are the wrong color for that year.

Recent genomic research has substantially clarified the origins of weedy rice. Whole-genome sequencing of 524 global weedy rice samples, published in Genome Biology in 2020, confirmed that weed populations have evolved multiple times independently from cultivated rice ancestors through a process known as feralization or de-domestication, rather than from wild rice. A strikingly high proportion of contemporary Asian weed strains can be traced to a small number of Green Revolution cultivars widely grown in the late twentieth century. Latin American weedy rice stands out as having originated primarily through hybridization between weedy and cultivated forms. The genomic regions underlying weedy adaptations such as seed shattering and dormancy largely do not overlap with the domestication targets that distinguish cultivated rice from wild rice, suggesting that feralization proceeds through distinct genetic pathways from domestication. In some strains, hybridization with cultivated rice has paradoxically introduced both crop-like traits such as shorter plant height and wild-like traits such as deep seed dormancy, helping weedy rice persist and spread in paddy environments.
