= Synchronous flowering =

Plants flowering at the same time

Flowering synchrony is the amount of overlap between flowering periods of plants in their mating season compared to what would be expected to occur randomly under given environmental conditions. A population which is flowering synchronously has more plants flowering (producing pollen or receiving pollen) at the same time than would be expected to occur randomly. A population which is flowering asynchronously has fewer plants flowering at the same time than would be expected randomly. Flowering synchrony can describe synchrony of flowering periods within a year, across years, and across species in a community. There are fitness benefits and disadvantages to synchronized flowering, and it is a widespread phenomenon across pollination syndromes.

== History ==
Synchronous flowering has been observed in nature for centuries. Sources from the ninth and 10th centuries noted the interannual synchrony of bamboo species. Early scholarly work focused on interannual variation in the form of mast seeding in tree species such as pines and oaks. An early proposed explanation for masting was the resource management (or weather tracking) hypothesis. This suggested that trees produced large amounts of seeds in response to favorable resource availability and weather conditions. Subsequent research has shown that while weather and resource availability may act as proximate mechanisms for interannually synchronized flowering, the ultimate driver is adaptive evolution for increased mating opportunities.

Early studies of synchronous flowering were biased towards trees species, which typically exhibit higher within-year synchrony than herbaceous species. The field has since expanded to include more herbaceous species. Researchers have also begun to investigate biotic drivers of synchrony, such as pollinating mutualists and herbivorous antagonists.

Community and global patterns of flowering synchrony are emerging across species. Such broad patterns are prone to disturbance by anthropogenic change such as global warming and the introduction of invasive species. Little has been done to examine synchrony across plant functional groups (i.e. trees and herbaceous annuals and perennials), though differences in pollination syndromes complicate such analyses. More work is needed to understand how global shifts in flowering plant communities will reshape ecosystems.

== Scales of synchrony ==
Synchronous flowering can occur across a season (intrannual synchrony) or across multiple years (interannual synchrony) within a species, or across coflowering species in a community. Populations and communities can exhibit multiple types of synchrony simultaneously.

=== Within-year synchrony ===
The synchrony of a population of flowering plants can be described within a season by how many plants are flowering at given points in time, and the distributions of individuals' flowering start and end dates. More synchronized populations have lower variances for the period of time during which individuals are flowering. The point in time at which the most plants in a population are flowering is commonly described as "peak flowering."

When more plants are flowering simultaneously, there are more mates and mating opportunities available for individual plants. Self-incompatible plants, which constitute about half of all flowering plants, must outcross in order to reproduce. Within-season synchrony can increase the probability of successful outcrossing by donating pollen to, or receiving pollen from, a viable mate. In the case of wind-pollinated Juncus rushes, which exhibit multiple flowering pulses in a season, synchronized flowering allows plants to hedge their bets on the population experiencing appropriate environmental conditions for reproduction during at least one of the pulses.

=== Across-year synchrony ===
In plant species which flower every year, complete across-year synchrony has been achieved. Plants which do not flower every year can achieve varying degrees of synchrony. Resource consumption can dictate how frequently a dioecious or gynoecious plant flowers, as producing seeds is a significant resource investment. When a plant flowers asynchronously in a year in which few other individuals are flowering, it has few mating opportunities. Plants which are not well-pollinated do not invest much in seed production, which can allow them to flower again in a short time. This can re-synchronize individuals, because when they are well-pollinated and invest energy into seed production, they have limited resources to invest in flowering the following year.

Some species have highly canalized synchronous flowering cycles. Many bamboo species exhibit synchronous flowering return intervals, with some as long as 120 years. A proposed mechanism demonstrated that such extreme intervals can arise as a mutation and spread in a population when they align with the ancestral interval. For example, a plant with a mutation to flower every four years has many mating opportunities if it cycles with a population that flowers every two years, allowing the mutant to reproduce and pass on the four-year trait. Phylogenetic methods can reveal how across-year synchrony evolved in populations.

=== Community synchrony ===
Evidence for community synchrony is mixed and requires phylogenetic analyses to determine that synchrony is not simply a product of relatedness among co-occurring species. For plants with pollinator-mediated reproduction, plants with similar pollination syndromes may establish together where there are appropriate pollinators available, by a process called filtering. Plant species which share pollinators are likely to flower synchronously, and the presence of a coflowering species can facilitate pollination in a species. However, it is unclear whether group selection can act on a community to drive the evolution of synchrony in multiple species. Synchronously-flowering species in a community may evolve other divergent traits to avoid competition and prevent the transfer of heterospecific pollen.

Because overlap in flowering times can lead to pollinators maintaining site fidelity, there could be selection for overlapping, but not synchronous flowering in a community. Synchronously flowering species can also drive the evolution of longer flowering periods due to increased heterospecific pollen transfer, which could result in more synchronous flowering simply by sharing more overlapping days.

More work is needed to determine whether species' flowering synchrony can evolve due to the composition of the community they inhabit. Under similar biotic and abiotic drivers of synchrony, species in a community have the potential to undergo parallel evolution; to determine this, the plasticity of synchrony under different environmental conditions must be extricated from the heritable variation in phenological traits.

== Coevolution with animals ==
Coevolution can shape the trajectory of evolution for flowering synchrony in plants. Nearly 90% of flowering plants rely on animals for pollination services, and many plants rely on frugivorous animals to disperse seeds. Because plants cannot escape predators, they are also subject to herbivory and seed predation. These pressures can shape the evolution of synchrony.

=== Pollinators ===
Coevolution with pollinators has the potential to drive synchronous or asynchronous flowering. Pollination by a specialist can result in high flowering synchrony, as asynchronous flowering can result in erratic attraction of a specialist to a site. Showy floral displays tend to attract pollinators, and synchronous flowering can attract more pollinators to a population. High pollinator visitation to populations with high flowering synchrony can result in high outcrossing rates and increased seed set through a process called facilitation. However, when many plants are flowering, per-plant pollinator visitation may be reduced. There is a potential fitness benefit to asynchronous flowering when it results in reduced competition for pollinators and increased pollinator visitation. When pollinator attraction keeps pace with floral abundance, this is not a concern. Asynchronous flowering can also result in gene flow over greater distances, which can combat inbreeding due to spatial autocorrelation in populations of plants with seeds which do not disperse lengthy distances.

=== Herbivores ===
Predator satiation is a mechanism commonly thought to drive the evolution of masting (the result of across-year flowering synchrony) as well as within-year flowering synchrony. Predator satiation is particularly well-studied in trees species. When populations produce a large crop of seeds, seed predation is lower because the quantity of available food overwhelms the capacity of granivores to eat. This has been demonstrated in many systems, and is an effective evolutionary strategy when the production of large quantities of seeds is more efficient for an organism than producing a small quantity (in line with the economy of scale). It is also a more effective strategy when coupled with within-year flowering synchrony. Within-year synchrony can be driven by mutualist herbivores as well as antagonistic ones. Different kinds of seed predators can place differing evolutionary pressures on flowering plants; rodents and insects may eat the same seeds, but in different quantities and at different times, providing a challenging adaptive landscape for species to navigate.

Herbivores can drive selection for asynchrony, and asynchrony can result in lower predation. For plants which rely on predators to disperse seeds (e.g. frugivores), asynchrony is beneficial for precisely the reason why it is disadvantageous for plants under pressure from granivores. An asynchronously-flowering plant's fruits are more likely to be carried off and consumed due to low resource availability for frugivores, which can result in dispersal from the maternal plant and reduced competition for resources like light and water between parents and offspring.

== Abiotic cues ==
A degree of within-season synchrony is expected for populations and communities due to the Moran effect, which posits that the degree of differentiation in phenology between populations is comparable to the differentiation in environmental conditions. The Moran effect plays a role in flowering synchrony. Abiotic factors like moisture, day length and temperature can trigger flowering. Wind-pollinated species exhibit may flower in conjunction with trade winds to take advantage of more effective pollination conditions. Determining the degree to which within-year flowering synchrony is a consequence of the constraints of abiotic resource availability versus an evolved trait with fitness benefits is a field of research requiring further work.

Abiotic drivers of across-year synchrony has been investigated more thoroughly, as many early studies of flowering synchrony were concerned with determining the role of abiotic cues in interannual flowering synchrony. Abiotic cues which trigger within-season synchrony are frequently correlated with across-year synchrony as well. Abiotic cues seem to act as a proximate driver of synchrony which has ultimate evolutionary benefits. Variation in microclimate associated with poor growing conditions can result in more asynchronous reproduction across a population.

Some global patterns of community flowering synchrony have been identified. In ecosystems which experience distinct growing seasons and winters, flowering time is limited to periods with adequate temperature and light. This results in community synchrony simply due to the fact that plants may be physiologically incapable of flowering in the dead of winter. In the high latitudes of the tropics, where plant communities are not constrained by unfavorable weather, flowering times could diverge due to selective or pressures or simply because of genetic drift. In addition to these patterns, plants at lower latitudes more frequently exhibit interannual flowering synchrony.

Abiotic disturbance can drive the evolution of synchrony. Irregularly disturbed environments can result in the evolution of asynchronous reproduction, which is more robust to catastrophic damage to a population. However, disturbance which occurs more regularly and poses a more reliable selective pressure on species can drive synchrony. Flowering in the prairie plant Echinacea angustifolia is more synchronized after fire, once a common feature of the tallgrass prairie ecosystem.

== Speciation ==
Divergent patterns of flowering synchrony can result in speciation, and asynchronous flowering can prevent hybridization. By occupying different niches in flowering time, sympatric speciation can occur. This is the case in bamboo species with multiplicative across-year flowering intervals. The unrestricted growing season of the tropics may allow for speciation due to shifts in flowering periods, especially where microclimate variation among metapopulations exist. Asynchronous reproduction between congeners can be maintained by differential responses to abiotic cues, preventing hybridization. Dramatic environmental disturbance could disrupt the interannual flowering period of a large portion of a population, resulting in a temporally isolated population which could potentially evolve into a distinct species. Flowering synchrony could shift and evolve in concert with novel mutualist pollinator or antagonistic predator, resulting in speciation, though this has not been empirically demonstrated.

== Conservation concerns ==
=== Fragmented populations ===
Asynchronously flowering species are at particular risk for extinction following habitat fragmentation. Habitat fragmentation can reduce the population of available mates due to population size reduction and the creation of insurmountable barriers to pollinator movement. In an asynchronously-reproducing population, this can isolate individuals in time and result in no mating opportunities. The loss of mutualist frugivores (particularly vertebrates) due to habitat reduction can also decrease selective pressure for asynchronous reproduction. This is also a possibility for pollinators, particularly specialists. Community synchrony has the potential to increase as asynchronously-flowering species are filtered out by local extinction due to lack of available mates. Synchrony may also increase as the facultative benefits of large floral displays to attract pollinators due to decreased floral displays at the species level. Habitat fragmentation increases edge effects in populations, potentially creating greater microclimate variation and decreasing synchrony due to uneven abiotic cues.

=== Invasive species ===
The presence of invasive species can alter the degree of synchrony in a population. In one example, the presence of an invasive species increased community synchrony. While this can increase the floral display and attractiveness of a patch to pollinators, invasive plants can act as competitors if they are more attractive than native coflowering species. A study found that plant communities assembled with a high diversity of differently-colored flowers, potentially to avoid competition for pollinators attracted to particular colors in floral displays. The presence of an invasive plant in this community decreased the overdispersion of color diversity. Invasive plants can drive evolution in the floral traits of native congeners; coevolution with both an invasive congener and a mutual pollinator of the two species could result in evolving synchrony between them. However, the attractiveness of invasive floral displays can also result in facilitation of pollination in a native species. Invasive species can take advantage of an unoccupied flowering niche. If the flowering period of the invader is entirely unoccupied by native species, the invader may monopolize pollinator activity and will decrease community synchrony.

=== Climate change ===
Climate change can shift synchronous plant phenology by changing the timing of abiotic factors which cue flowering, but it can also drive asynchrony. By reshaping the phenology of coevolved animal species, climate change has the potential to disrupt selection for reproductive synchrony. In one example, a plant's flowering phenology and its seed-dispersing ant mutualist's phenology are both triggered by temperature cues. Because the plant's phenology is more prone to change under a new climate regime than the ant's, the plant is decoupled from the selective pressure for flowering synchrony that the ant mutualism imposes. Insects appear to have less plastic or adaptive responses to advanced warming, which can result in the loss of mutualisms. One study estimated that under climate warming 17-50% of pollinator species in the study would have their host plants disrupted. Though shifting phenology could result in the loss of mutualisms for plants, some biotically-pollinated plants which have undergone phenological advancement due to the warming climate appear to have established new mutualisms with appropriately-timed pollinators and do not suffer from decreased reproductive output.

== See also ==
- Pollination
- Reproductive synchrony
- Bamboo#Mass flowering
- Mast seeding
- Predator satiation
- Swarm behaviour#Plants
